= 164th (North Lancashire) Brigade =

North Lancashire Brigade 164th (North Lancashire) Brigade 164th Infantry Brigade
- Active: 1908–1919; 1920-1945
- Country: United Kingdom
- Branch: Territorial Army
- Type: Infantry
- Size: Brigade
- Part of: 55th (West Lancashire) Division; 55th (West Lancashire) Infantry Division

The 164th (North Lancashire) Brigade was an infantry brigade of the British Army that saw active service in the First World War as part of the 55th (West Lancashire) Division. As the 164th Infantry Brigade, it remained in the United Kingdom throughout the Second World War, as part of the 55th (West Lancashire) Infantry Division.

== Formation ==
The brigade was raised in 1908 when the Territorial Force was created and was originally formed as the North Lancashire Brigade, attached to the West Lancashire Division. The brigade was composed of two Volunteer battalions of the King's Own Royal Regiment (Lancaster) and two of the Loyal Regiment (North Lancashire).

== First World War ==
The division was mobilised on 5 August 1914, the day after Britain declared war on Germany, thus beginning the First World War.

From late 1914 to early 1915 units of the brigade began to be sent independently overseas, mainly to France and Belgium, and were replaced by the 2nd Line units being formed, the 170th (2/1st North Lancashire) Brigade of 57th (2nd West Lancashire) Division. To differentiate the 1st Line battalions from the 2nd Line, the prefix '1/' was adopted by all 1st Line battalions (1/4th King's Own) and '2/' for all 2nd Line.

In April 1915 the 164th Brigade was redesignated 154th Brigade and joined the 51st (Highland) Division. In June 1916 the brigade, now again redesignated 164th (1st North Lancashire) Brigade, returned to the West Lancashire Division, now the 55th (West Lancashire) Division, and served with it for the rest of the war on the Western Front in battles at Passchendaele, Cambrai and Estaires in 1918.

=== Order of Battle ===
- 1/4th Battalion, King's Own (Royal Lancaster Regiment)
- 1/5th Battalion, King's Own (Royal Lancaster Regiment) (left 15 February 1915)
- 1/4th Battalion, Loyal North Lancashire Regiment
- 1/5th Battalion, Loyal North Lancashire Regiment (left 13 February 1915)
- 2/5th Battalion, Lancashire Fusiliers (from February 1915)
- 1/8th (Irish) Battalion, King's (Liverpool Regiment) (from January 1916, left January 1918)
- 164th Machine Gun Company, Machine Gun Corps (formed 19 February 1916, moved to 55th Battalion, Machine Gun Corps 7 March 1918)
- 164th Trench Mortar Battery (formed March 1916)

== Interwar years ==
Both the brigade and division were disbanded after the war in 1919 but later reformed in 1920 in the Territorial Army as the 164th (North Lancashire) Infantry Brigade and continued to serve with the 55th Division. The brigade was reconstituted with the same four battalions as it had before the First World War.

However, in the late 1930s the brigade saw all of its battalions posted away or converted to other roles: in 1938 the 4th Battalion, King's Own Royal Regiment (Lancaster) was transferred to the Royal Artillery and converted into the 56th (King's Own) Anti-Tank Regiment, Royal Artillery, the 5th Battalion, King's Own was transferred to the 126th (East Lancashire) Infantry Brigade, 55th (West Lancashire) Infantry Division. They were both replaced in the brigade by the 4th and 5th battalions of the South Lancashire Regiment, from the 166th (South Lancashire) Infantry Brigade.

The 4th Battalion, Loyal Regiment (North Lancashire) was transferred to the Royal Engineers and became the 62nd (Loyals) Searchlight Regiment and the 5th Battalion was converted into a reconnaissance motorcycle battalion when the 55th Division was reorganised as a motorised infantry division and the 164th Brigade was disbanded.

It was, however, reformed in mid-1939, now as the 164th Infantry Brigade, when the 55th Division was ordered to form a duplicate division, the 59th (Staffordshire) Infantry Division. The 164th Brigade again came under command of the 55th (West Lancashire) Infantry Division.

== Second World War ==
The brigade again served in the Second World War with the division throughout the war and, in October 1941, no longer was an operational formation to be sent overseas. In January 1942 it was reduced to a Lower Establishment yet it was not reduced to a training division as most others were. In December 1943, with the division, it was sent to Northern Ireland and was raised to a Higher Establishment in May 1944, before returning to the United Kingdom in July. It served there until the war finally ended in 1945 and the division was disbanded in 1946 and was not reformed.

=== Order of Battle ===
- 9th Battalion, King's Regiment (Liverpool) (until 17 September 1942)
- 1/4th Battalion, South Lancashire Regiment (until 23 July 1944)
- 2/4th Battalion, South Lancashire Regiment (until 8 September 1942, later became 13th Battalion, Parachute Regiment)
- 164th Infantry Brigade Anti-Tank Company (formed 14 September 1940, disbanded 8 July 1941)
- 17th Battalion, Durham Light Infantry (from 10 September 1942 until 25 September 1943)
- 10th Battalion, Green Howards (from 20 September 1943 until 16 May 1943)
- 9th Battalion, South Lancashire Regiment (from 13 August 1943 until 12 July 1944)
- 9th Battalion, Buffs (Royal East Kent Regiment) (from 29 September 1943 until 25 July 1944)
- 4th Battalion, Devonshire Regiment (from 1 August 1944 until July 1945)
- 5th Battalion, Somerset Light Infantry (from 1 August 1944 until July 1945)
- 1st Battalion, Duke of Cornwall's Light Infantry (from 1 August 1944 until July 1945)

== Recipients of the Victoria Cross ==
- Lance Sergeant Tom Fletcher Mayson, 1/4th Battalion, King's Own Royal Regiment (Lancaster), Great War
- 2nd Lieutenant Joseph Henry Collin, 1/4th Battalion, King's Own Royal Regiment (Lancaster), Great War
- Lance Corporal James Hewitson, 1/4th Battalion, King's Own Royal Regiment (Lancaster), Great War
- 2nd Lieutenant Edward Felix Baxter, 1/8th Battalion, King's Regiment (Liverpool), Great War
- Fusilier James Hutchinson, 2/5th Battalion, Lancashire Fusiliers, Great War
- Lieutenant Colonel Bertram Best-Dunkley, 2/5th Battalion, Lancashire Fusiliers, Great War
- 2nd Lieutenant John Schofield, 2/5th Battalion, Lancashire Fusiliers, Great War
