= 55th (West Lancashire) Division =

WWI British Army unit

West Lancashire Division 55th (West Lancashire) Division
- The divisional insignia, the Red Rose of Lancaster
- Active: 1908–1915; 1916–1919
- Country: United Kingdom
- Branch: Territorial Force (1908–1919)
- Type: Infantry
- Peacetime HQ: Liverpool
- Motto: "We win or die who wear the rose of Lancaster"
- Engagements: Battle of the Somme; Battle of Passchendaele; Battle of Cambrai; Battle of Estaires

Commanders
- Notable commanders: Hugh Jeudwine

The 55th (West Lancashire) Division was an infantry division of the British Army's Territorial Force (TF) that saw extensive combat during the First World War. It was raised initially in 1908 as the West Lancashire Division. Following the outbreak of the First World War, in 1914, the majority of the division's men volunteered for overseas service. Those who did not volunteer were used to form new reserve units, and on 31 August 1914 these were used to create the 2nd West Lancashire Division. Rather than being deployed as a whole formation, the West Lancashire Division was broken up during 1914 and 1915, as its troops were dispatched piecemeal to the Western Front. As each left, they were replaced by reserves. When the last volunteers departed for overseas service, the remnant of the division was amalgamated with the 2nd West Lancashire Division, and the West Lancashire Division ceased to exist.

In 1916, the division was reformed in France as the 55th (West Lancashire) Division and was reassigned its original units. During the Battle of the Somme, the division fought several actions at Guillemont, Ginchy, and Morval. In 1917, the division fought at Pilckem and the Menin Road Ridge, during the Battle of Passchendaele, and gained an excellent reputation. Late in 1917, the division fought in the Battle of Cambrai. Towards the end of the battle, a major German counterattack forced the division back over 1 mile (1.6 km). A court of inquiry was convened to examine this loss of territory and the division's conduct. The inquiry delivered findings that proved controversial with contemporary soldiers and modern historians. In 1918, the division faced the German spring offensive, and conducted a much-lauded defence of Givenchy during the Battle of Estaires. After the German offensive stalled, the division joined in the Hundred Days Offensive, the culminating offensive of the war. The division suffered almost 36,000 casualties, with 6,520 killed, in over two years of combat. After the end of hostilities, the division was slowly demobilised and eventually disbanded in 1919. In 1920, the division was reformed in England.

== Formation ==
In 1901, following lessons learnt from the Second Boer War and increased tension with the German Empire, the United Kingdom sought to reform the British Army to fight a European adversary. This task fell to Secretary of State for War, Richard Haldane, who implemented the Haldane Reforms. The Territorial and Reserve Forces Act 1907 created a new Territorial Force (TF) by merger of the Yeomanry and the Volunteer Force in 1908. This resulted in the creation of 14 divisions, included the West Lancashire Division. Each division was to be around 18–19,000 men strong. However, the TF was never able to recruit sufficient numbers of men to achieve this uniformly. The territorials were liable to serve only in the United Kingdom, and the divisions would take over the defence of the country when the regular army was abroad on military service. In 1910, the Imperial Service Obligation was introduced. This allowed territorials to volunteer for overseas service before any national emergency. Haldane saw the primary function of the TF as a way to expand the British expeditionary forces and was confident that up to a quarter of the men would volunteer on mobilisation. It was expected that on the outbreak of war, it would take the TF divisions up to six months to come up to an acceptable training standard.

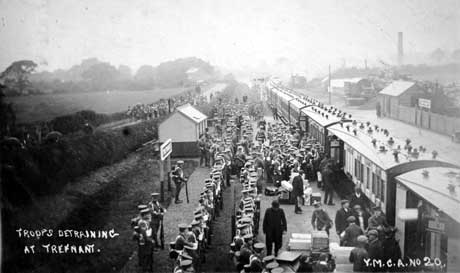
4th Battalion, King's Own (Royal Lancaster) Regiment troops disembarking at Trefnant for annual training at Caerwys, 1909

Major-General Edward Dickson commanded the new division composed of the North Lancashire, Liverpool and South Lancashire Brigades. The division recruited from Lancashire, which then included what is now Merseyside, parts of Cheshire, Greater Manchester, and southern Cumbria. The divisional headquarters, two brigade headquarters, most of the divisional artillery (with elements at Seaforth Barracks), elements of other divisional assets, and five infantry battalions were based in Liverpool. The rest of the division was spread out, with garrisons in Blackpool, Blundellsands, Kendal, Lancaster (including the North Lancashire Brigade headquarters), Southport, St Helens, Warrington, and Widnes. In July 1909, the division was inspected by Edward VII at Knowsley. A month later, it began its first annual training camp at Caerwys, Wales. It was the first Territorial division to conduct field training.

French Général Hippolyte Langlois watched and reviewed the division during this training. Langlois lauded the soldiers' use of terrain, initiative, stamina, a unit cohesion he believed was founded on civilian life relationships, and morale and motivation that he saw coming from a sense of patriotism. His criticisms included limited technical and tactical proficiency, especially within the Royal Field Artillery units. He believed the flaws were due in part to the small training areas available and inadequate live fire practice. Langlois believed the division capable of meeting the TF mandate of repelling an invasion. The historian Ian Beckett commented there were deficiencies with the force: in 1910 "a third ... had failed the modest musketry requirements of firing off 23 rounds"; in 1912, around two-thirds had completed their required training, and divisions failed to retain soldiers. The historian Kevin Mitchinson wrote there were pre-war concerns that members of the division were not physically fit enough to soldier, that the division "was not particularly highly rated", and was 2,900 men below establishment in 1914.

== First World War ==
=== Early years ===
Due to their proximity, the pre-war deployment plan for the West and the East Lancashire Divisions was to be deployed to Ireland to relieve regular army formations. At the outbreak of the First World War in 1914, the West Lancashire Division returned from its annual training in Wales to barracks and depots in Lancashire. Advanced elements were to depart for Ireland to establish billets at various locations, including Limerick. This move was called off on 5 August, and five days later it was announced that local Irish reserve forces would ideally relieve the regular army formations instead. The cancellation resulted mostly from the logistical difficulties of transporting inbound and outbound troops, and a lack of equipment and transport between the two Lancashire divisions. Mitchinson wrote an extra dimension existed, as "there was concern among the authorities that some of the King's Liverpool battalions might have rather too much sympathy with potentially rebellious sections of Irish society".

With the move to Ireland cancelled, the division was immediately dispersed around the country. The South Lancashire Brigade went to bolster defences around the Firth of Forth, Scotland; the Liverpool Brigade was assigned to Central Force and moved to Canterbury, Kent; other elements of the division went to Oxfordshire. The men in England were used to guard vulnerable points, including railway lines, bridges, and tunnels. With popular enthusiasm for the war high, potential recruits flooded the division's regimental depots. The divisional historian, James Ogden Coop, wrote, "every existing vacancy was filled and could have been filled ten times over". Some of these recruits were used to bring the East Lancashire Division up to strength. The dispersion of the division affected training, which for some units was impossible to undertake. Following the outbreak of the war, on 13 August 1914, Secretary of State for War Lord Kitchener signalled a willingness to deploy territorial units overseas in which 80 per cent of the men (reduced to 60 per cent at the end of the month) had volunteered. Coop wrote "every unit in the division volunteered". Two days later, the division was ordered to separate those who had volunteered from those who had not. The latter were used to form reserve units. On 31 August, these reserve formations coalesced to become the 2nd West Lancashire Division, which was based initially at the West Lancashire Division's peacetime barracks and depots.

The all-volunteer West Lancashire Division went through a succession of general officers commanding (GOC) before Major-General John Forster was given command on 3 September 1914. Because of the casualties suffered by the British Expeditionary Force (BEF) during the opening months of fighting on the Western Front, the division's volunteers were used as reinforcements. Between October 1914 and May 1915, the division was steadily drained; companies of engineers, artillery, medical personnel, and battalions of infantry were removed from the division to reinforce other divisions. The Commander-in-Chief, Home Army, General Ian Hamilton, questioned the wisdom of using the division this way as he believed the men were "'fully 20% behind the rest' in efficiency and training". However, he believed the deployment of intact battalions would not affect their esprit de corps, as he perceived there being a loyalty greater to the battalion rather than the division. As battalions departed, reserve units from the 2nd West Lancashire Division replaced them. In April 1915, the North Lancashire Brigade, the division's last remaining infantry formation of volunteers, was transferred to the 51st (Highland) Division. The rest of the West Lancashire Division was then amalgamated into the 2nd West Lancashire Division, based around Canterbury, and the former division ceased to exist.

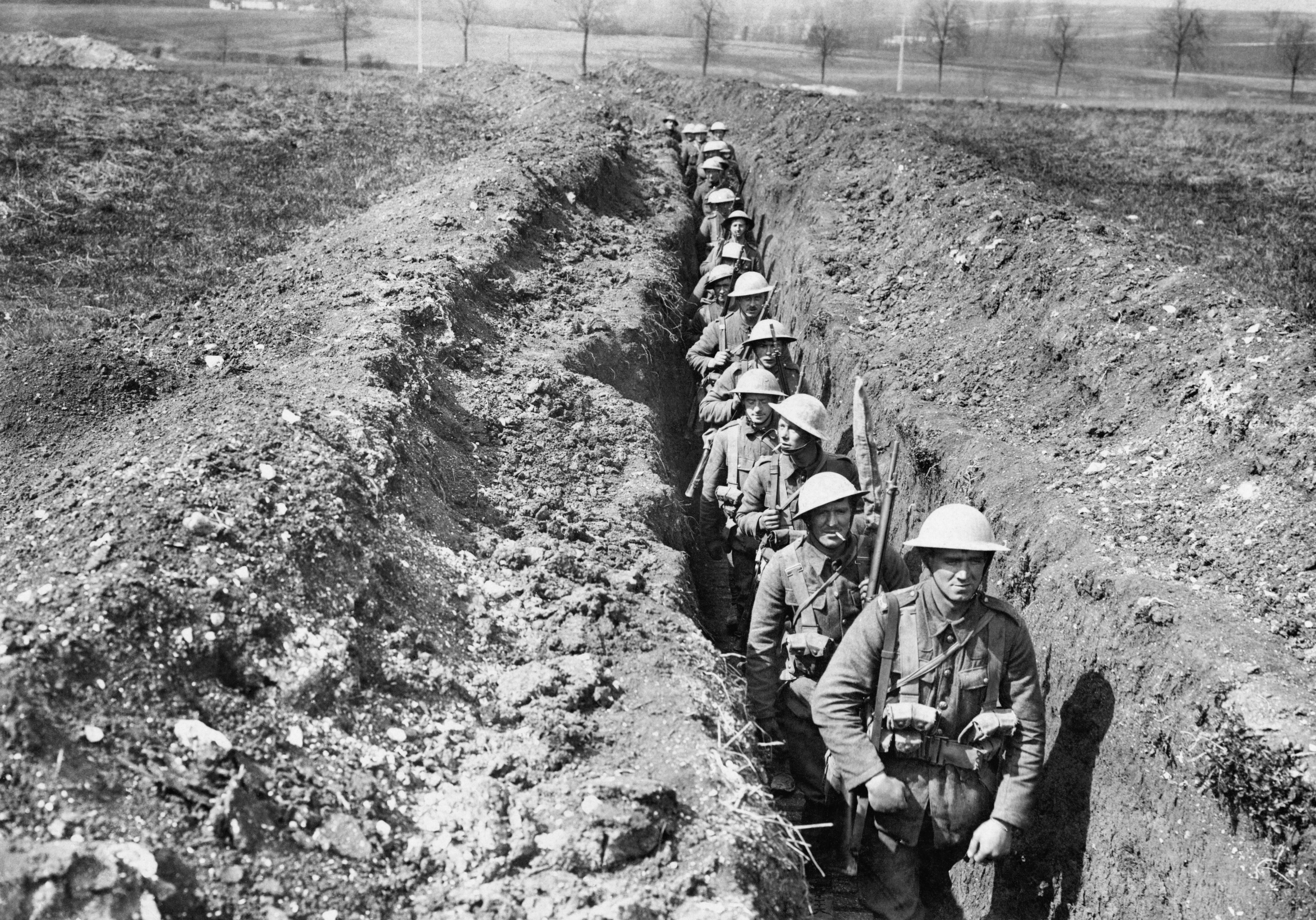
Men of the King's Liverpool Regiment, moving along a communication trench leading to the front line near Wailly, 16 April 1916.

In November 1915, the Army Council authorised the reformation of the division in France, and provided a new designation: the 55th (West Lancashire) Division. Beginning on 3 January 1916, the division's former units assembled near Hallencourt. This included the arrival of the North Lancashire Brigade, which had been renumbered as the 164th Brigade in 1915. The Liverpool and South Lancashire Brigades were reformed, but numbered as the 165th and the 166th Brigades respectively. On 27 January 1916, the reformation was completed, and Major-General Hugh Jeudwine was assigned as commander. These experienced troops were no longer completely made up of the men who had left in 1915, due to casualties and new drafts. By the end of March, the division was still 3,000 men under establishment. The division comprised three brigades: the 164th Brigade, consisting of the 1/4th Battalion, King's Own (Royal Lancaster Regiment) (1/4KORL), the 1/4th Battalion, Loyal North Lancashire Regiment (1/4LR), the 2/5th Battalion, Lancashire Fusiliers (2/5LF) and the 1/8th (Irish) Battalion, King's (Liverpool Regiment) (Liverpool Irish); the 165th Brigade consisted of the 1/5th Battalion, King's (Liverpool Regiment) (1/5KR), the 1/6KR, the 1/7KR, and the 1/9KR; and the 166th Brigade consisted of the 1/10th (Scottish) Battalion, King's (Liverpool Regiment) (Liverpool Scottish), the 1/5th Battalion, the South Lancashire Regiment (1/5SL), the 1/5th Battalion, King's Own (Royal Lancaster Regiment) (1/5KORL) and the 1/5th Battalion, Loyal North Lancashire Regiment (1/5LR). During 1916, Jeudwine adopted the Red Rose of Lancaster as the divisional emblem, to foster county pride in the division. The insignia inspired the creation of a poem that ended with "We win or die who wear the rose of Lancaster". This line was then adopted as the divisional motto.

=== First trench tour ===
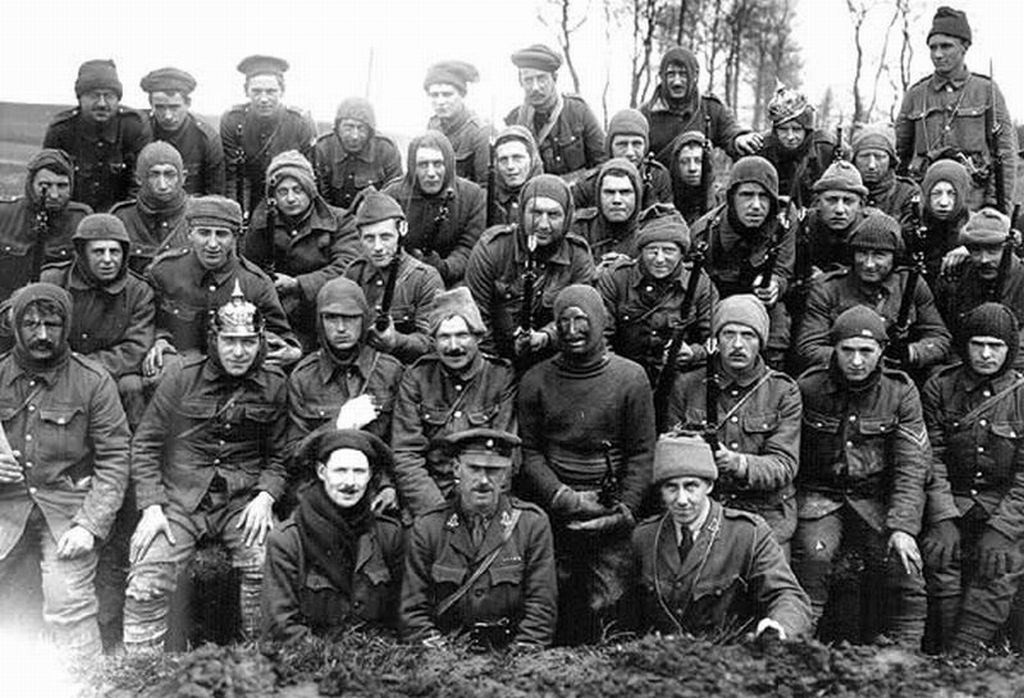
A raiding party of the Liverpool Irish, on the morning after the first large trench raid by the division.

On 16 February 1916, the division took over a sector of the front line between Brétencourt and Wailly, near Arras, and relieved the French 88th Division. They held this area until July, and carried out several trench raids. The Liverpool Irish launched the first on 17 April. Attacking at night, the battalion inflicted significant damage; its 56 casualties included the loss of Second Lieutenant Edward Felix Baxter. For his actions during the raid, Baxter earned the Victoria Cross (VC), the highest gallantry award available to British military personnel. A further VC was awarded to Private Arthur Procter in the aftermath of a raid on the night of 3/4 June.

Another significant raid was conducted on 28 June, this time during the day. Elements of six battalions crossed no man's land behind a smokescreen. A shift in the wind dispersed the smoke, and the raiders were subjected to heavy German fire. Two of the attacking parties were repelled while the other four entered the German trenches and inflicted casualties before they returned. Private James Hutchinson of the 2/5LF earned the VC for his actions during this raid. Losses for this raid are not reported. On 25 July, the division was relieved by the 11th (Northern) Division. During its five months in the trenches, the division suffered 1,110 casualties, more than twice the average casualty rate for British infantry battalions in the First World War.

=== Battle of the Somme ===
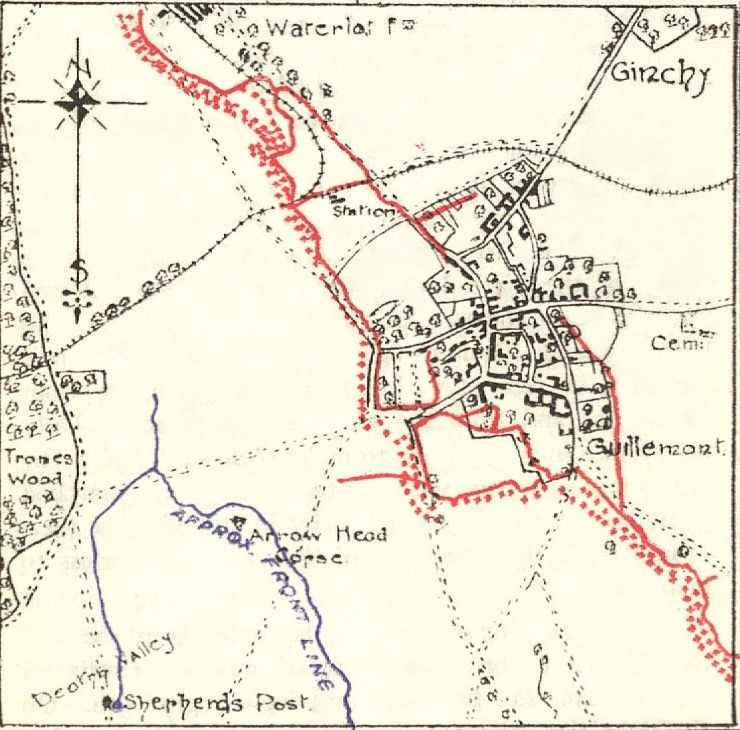
The division's positions in the Guillemont sector. British positions are shown in blue, and the German positions in red.

The division moved south to participate in the Battle of the Somme, which began on 1 July. It was given the objective of capturing the village of Guillemont and the nearby German trenches. The German defenders, dug in at the village and its environs, had already repulsed two attacks. These attacks, and those launched by the division, formed the prelude to the Battle of Guillemont. In August, the division made three unsuccessful assaults on the Germans positions, and suffered 4,126 casualties. Second Lieutenant Gabriel Coury, attached to the 1/4SL, and Captain Noel Godfrey Chavasse, a member of the Royal Army Medical Corps who was attached to the Liverpool Scottish, earned VCs for their actions during the fighting.

After a period of rest, the division returned to the front line on the night 4/5 September, and relieved the 24th Division near Delville Wood. It then took part in the Battle of Ginchy, on 9 September, with mixed results. The overall British effort resulted in the village's capture the next day. An attack was launched on 11 September to improve the local position, but failed. Between 10 and 12 September, the New Zealand Division relieved the 55th. The division returned to the front on 17 September, and relieved the 41st Division. The division next saw action on 25 September, when it attacked north-west of Gueudecourt as part of the Battle of Morval, a general offensive launched by the Fourth Army. The division overran several German positions, and repulsed a counter-attack. However, the overall Fourth Army effort failed to capture the village. On 28 September, the division was relieved and transferred north to the Ypres Salient.

=== Battle of Passchendaele ===
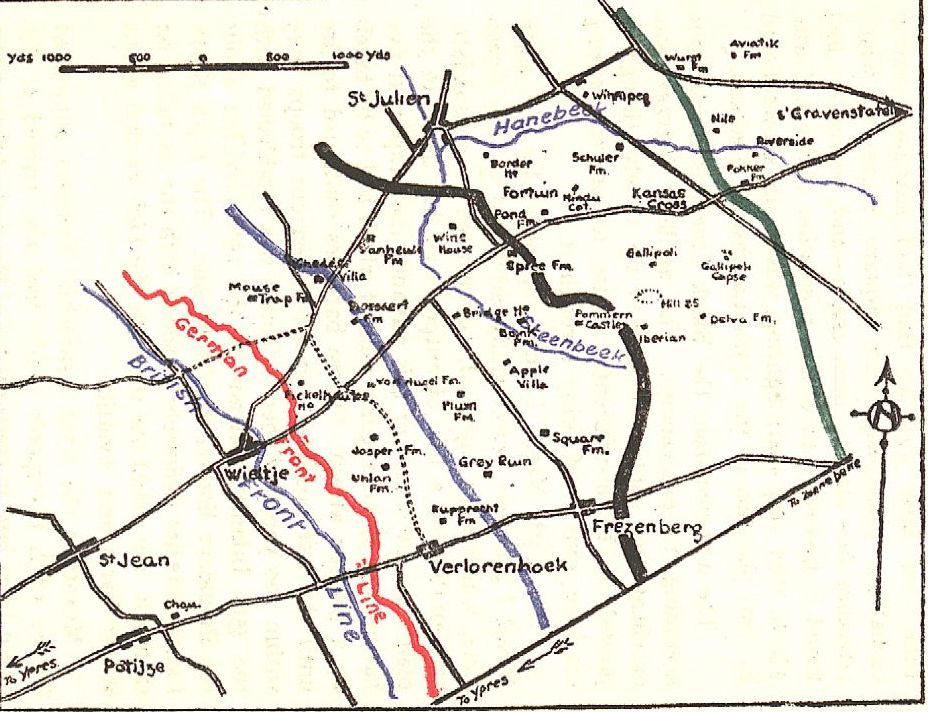
Division front line and objectives during the Battle of Pilckem Ridge. The blue line on the left denotes the British front line, with the German frontline outposts denoted in red. The additional coloured lines, east of the front line, show successive objectives of the division and the rough positions of the German first, second, and third line of trench systems.

The division re-entered the front line in October 1916, and manned a section of the Ypres Salient. It rested, re-equipped, and engaged in trench warfare. Towards the end of the year, in line with the British Army's evolving infantry doctrine, Jeudwine "recognized that many of his soldiers had held responsible positions in civilian life that required independent thought" and "by devolving decision-making down the chain of command he was able to harness their skills and experience to enhance tactical performance on the battlefield". In June 1917, Jeudwine authorised publication of the divisional magazine Sub Rosa (Under the rose). This was a further effort to foster a link between county pride and the division; the magazine contained poetry based on Lancashire history, county tales, and cartoons.

By July, the division was part of the Fifth Army. It participated in the initial assaults of the Battle of Pilckem Ridge, which formed part of the larger Third Battle of Ypres (also known as the Battle of Passchendaele). The division's objective was to advance through to the third line of German trenches opposing them. In preparation, an intensive artillery barrage was fired. At 03:50 on 31 July, the attack began. Supported by artillery and at least one Mark IV tank, the attack overran the German first-line and second-line trenches. By the end of the morning, the division had captured the third-line trenches along with five German 77 mm (3 in) gun batteries. German counter-attacks during the afternoon forced the division to abandon the captured third line. For their actions on 31 July, Lieutenant-Colonel Bertram Best-Dunkley, of the 2/5LF, and Lance Sergeant Tom Mayson, of the 1/4KORL, earned VCs. Over the next two days, the division consolidated the ground seized. On 2 August, the Germans counter-attacked. The attack was repulsed, during which Chavasse earned a second VC. After the fighting ended, the division was relieved. During the battle, the 55th suffered 3,552 casualties and took 600 German prisoners.

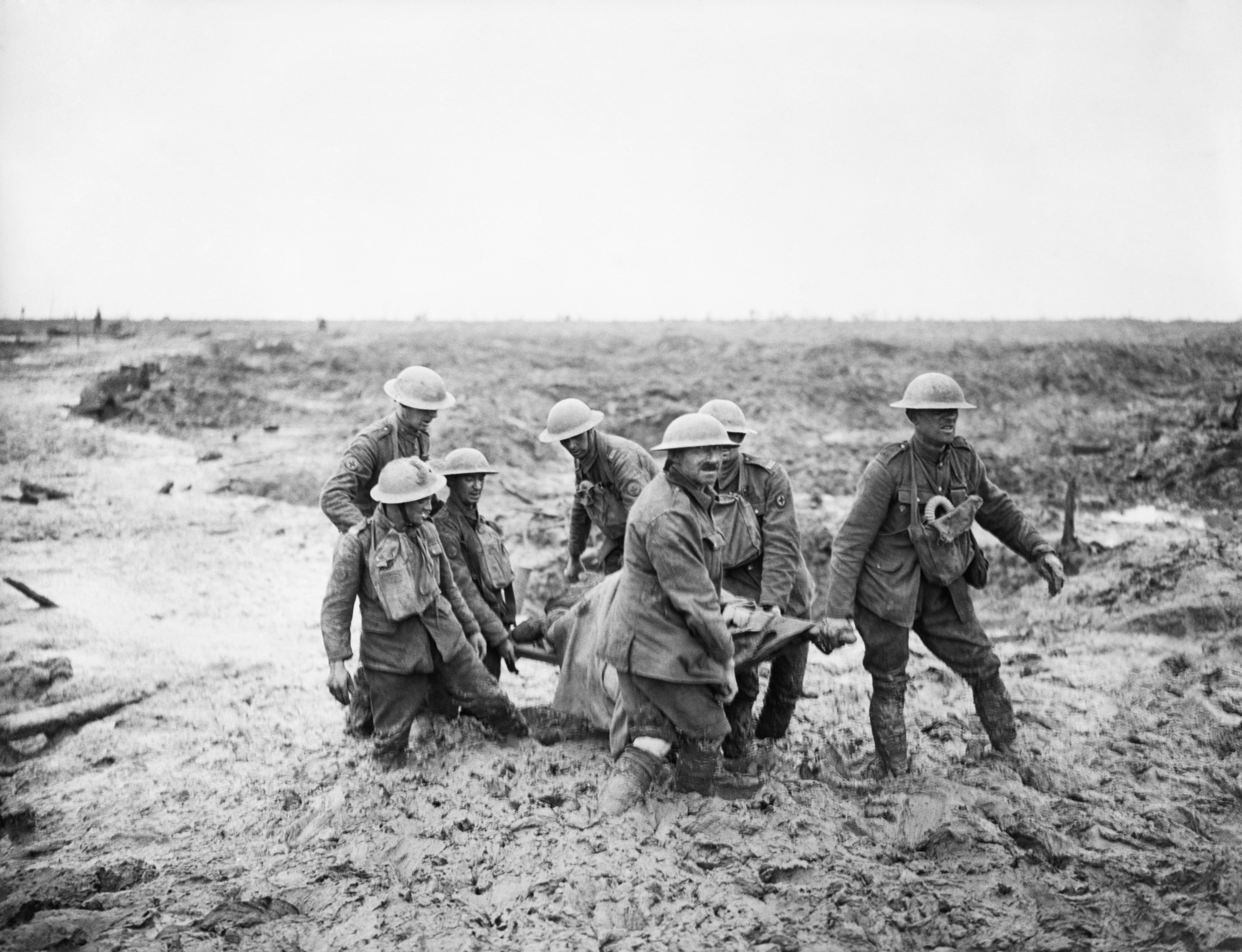
Stretcher bearers during the Battle of Pilckem Ridge

The 55th was given a period of rest, during which it received reinforcements and conducted training. Field Marshal Sir Douglas Haig, commander of the BEF, visited the division. On 12 September, the division returned to the same sector of the front with the order to take the final objective that had eluded them on 31 July. This included an important ridge and a strongpoint known as Schuler Farm. In the division's absence, two abortive attacks had been made on these locations. The division moved during the night of 19/20 September and manned the front line trenches and the water-logged shell holes that dotted the area. While a 24-hour bombardment of the German positions indicated an imminent assault, German prisoners reported that the attack was anticipated as they had seen tape that had been laid to assist the British in their move into the correct area. On 20 September, the Battle of the Menin Road Ridge began. During the day, the division captured the ridge and fought off counter-attacks. Schuler Farm fell the following day. On the afternoon of 21 September, the Germans launched an unsuccessful counter-attack to retake lost ground. Coop called the German losses "appalling", while divisional casualties amounted to 2,730.

This marked the division's final role in the Third Battle of Ypres. Between 22 and 24 September, the division was relieved by the 39th Division. The division moved south to Cambrai, where it joined VII Corps in the Third Army. The historian Helen McCartney wrote that by the end of this period, "the 55th Division was described as 'a good fighting division, possessing the right spirit' and a 'first rate division' by its army and corps commanders in their reports to GHQ".

=== Battle of Cambrai ===
The division took over 8,000 yards (7,300 m) of the front line adjacent to the village of Épehy. Rather than a continuous trench line, the division occupied a series of fortified posts, each capable of holding a platoon, that were connected by communication trenches to facilitate movement. On 18 November, the division suffered from a trench raid, during which 40 members of the division were captured. Coop stated it was believed that the Germans obtained information about the division's upcoming attack from these prisoners. However, the historian Bryan Cooper wrote that the men provided no information, and the German 184th Infantry Regiment gleaned this information from six prisoners taken from the 36th (Ulster) Division. The division was assigned a supporting role in the Battle of Cambrai, tasked with preventing German forces from moving north to reinforce their comrades against the main British effort. It was decided that the 164th Brigade would assault two German strongpoints: Gillemont Farm, and a position known as the "Knoll". As a consequence of the acquired intelligence, the Germans abandoned their front line trenches and reinforced their second line positions. In addition, new, deep, narrow trenches were dug east of Gillemont Farm where counter-attack forces were massed, and from where they could launch rifle grenades upon the attacking force.

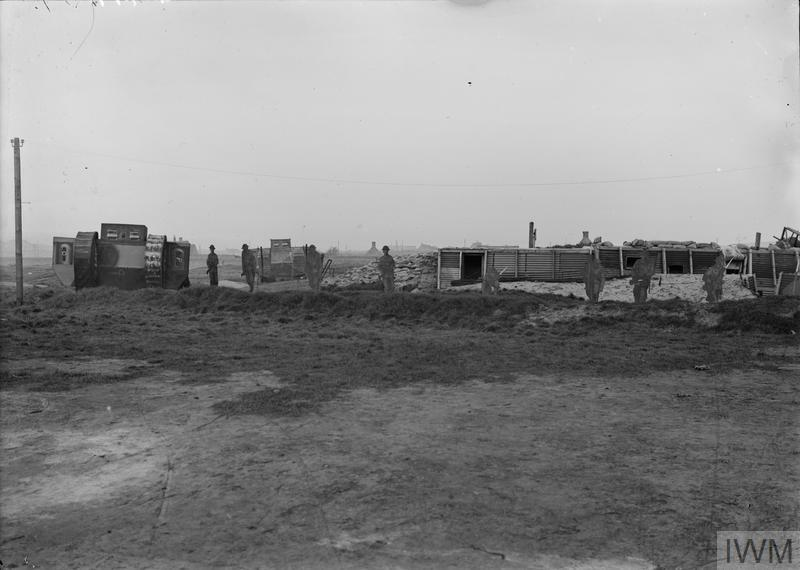
An example of British deception methods

On 20 November, the artillery bombarded the German positions. A smokescreen was deployed on one flank to cover the attack, thermite rounds were used to neutralise German machine guns, and 1,320 gas shells were fired onto other German positions. The division also utilised deception measures that included dummies and a mock tank, to attract German fire away from the attack. Behind creeping barrages two attacks were launched, one towards the Knoll and the second towards Gillemont Farm. Back and forth fighting lasted throughout the morning at both positions. By 13:00, German counter-attacks had retaken both and fighting ceased for the day, except for bombardments. During the night, patrols were dispatched without incident. The following morning, a ten-minute bombardment of the German positions took place at 05:00, followed by a three-minute hurricane bombardment at 06:30. A creeping barrage followed to simulate a British attack that resulted in the Germans manning their positions. This effort aided in ensuring German forces were not redeployed. This ended the division's effort in support of the battle, and had resulted in around 600 casualties.

=== Cambrai counter-attack ===
A resumption of trench warfare followed, with nightly patrols conducted. On 28 November, German artillery fire on the division's positions increased. This was judged to be additional German batteries registering their guns, but coincided with low-flying reconnaissance flights by the German Air Force and a reported build-up of German forces behind their lines. Jeudwine concluded the division was about to be attacked, reported this up the chain of command, and ordered an artillery bombardment of German positions on the morning of 29 November. His judgement was correct; the German 2nd Army intended to use seven divisions to retake the territory lost in earlier fighting. The following day, the division took over part of the front held by the 20th (Light) Division. This resulted in the division being responsible for 13,000 yards (12,000 m) of the front line, a span normally held by three divisions. The 166th Brigade held the division's left flank (from north to south: the 1/5SL, the 1/5LF, the Liverpool Scottish; the 1/5KORL in reserve), the 165th Brigade held the right flank (from north to south: the 1/6KR, the 1/5KR, the 1/7KR; the 1/9KR in reserve), and the 164th Brigade was held in reserve.

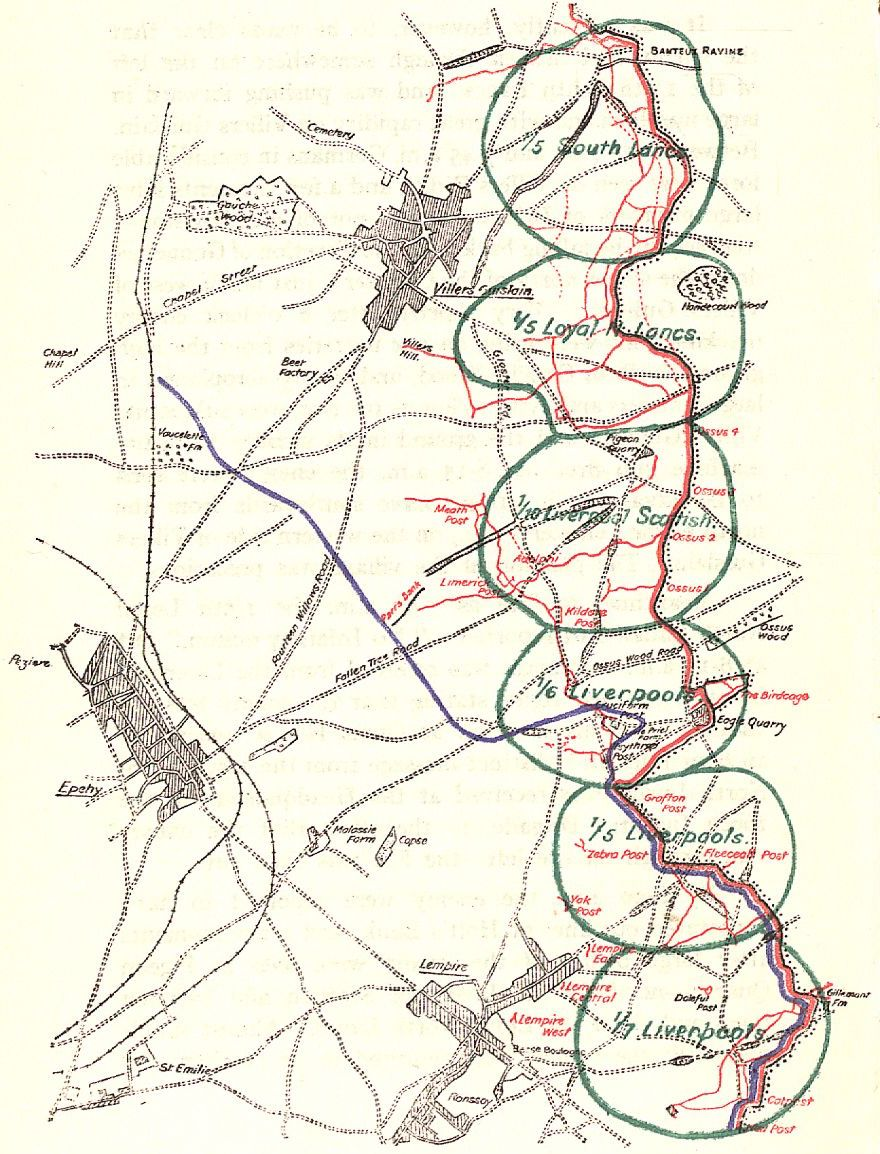
Positions of the division before (red and green), and after the German attack on 30 November (blue line).

At 07:00 on 30 November, the German counter-attack began with a heavy barrage across the entire divisional front. An hour later, German machine guns opened fire, and were supplemented by aerial attacks. On the division's left, the Germans broke through and were able to use this to outflank the 55th Division's positions. The 166th Brigade was heavily engaged, with some positions coming under attack after being outflanked and surrounded. At least two companies of infantry, one each from the 1/5SL and the Liverpool Scottish, were overrun during the attack. Despite fierce resistance from the brigade, slowing the German advance, they were unable to stop the Germans from penetrating the front to a depth of 800 yards (730 m). Some of the front line troops that had fallen back, despite their losses, launched minor counter-attacks that denied high ground to the Germans. In one sector, a composite group of the 1/5KORL, the 1/5KR, and the Liverpool Scottish were cut off, but held their position until 05:00 the next morning when they fought their way back to the main divisional positions. The 166th Brigade, reinforced with elements of the 164th Brigade that had been held in reserve, was ordered to dig new trench lines and lay wire in front of Épehy to deny the village to the Germans.

The 165th Brigade also came under heavy attack, and its battalions had varied experiences. The 1/5KR threw back the German attack on their front; the 1/7KR stalled the assault in their sector, although German troops did penetrate in several places; the 1/6KR, after they lost ground, were able to launch counter-attacks to retake their lost positions. Much heavy back and forth fighting took place throughout the afternoon, while VII Corps organised assets for a counter-attack. During the fighting, German infantry advanced to within 300 yards (270 m) of Sergeant Cyril Edward Gourley's howitzer battery, of the division's 276th Brigade Royal Field Artillery (RFA), and snipers infiltrated behind the battery. Despite this, he kept one gun in action from 10:30 until dark, and fired over open sights at German troops. Under constant fire, he held the Germans back in his area and destroyed one machine-gun. These actions resulted in the battery being saved, which was then withdrawn after nightfall, and earned him the VC.

Depending on the source, the division was pushed back between 2,000 yards (1,800 m) and 4,000 yards (3,700 m) during the fighting. Later in the day, a VII Corps counter-attack allowed the front to be held and stemmed the German attack. Over the following days, the division was withdrawn from the front line to the Flamicourt area to rest. Before it left, Lieutenant-General Sir Thomas Snow (VII Corps) wrote that he

...cannot allow the 55th Division to leave... without expressing... his satisfaction at the way they fought and worked during the recent operations. It is not at present quite clear what happened on the left of the Division, but, from the enquiries made ..., he knows that ... in spite of the heavy losses incurred, [the 30th] was a day which will always reflect credit on the 55th Division.

A casualty breakdown for 30 November is not available; for the period 20 November to 8 December, the division suffered 3,259 casualties. The historian Alexander Watson described the day's fighting as "one of the most severe battlefield routs of the conflict", and "the 55th Division dissolved in the face of the attack". Mitchinson wrote that "some battalions of [the division] virtually disappeared east of Épehy in what could be seen as questionable circumstances". Of the opposite opinion, the historian A.J. Smithers wrote "the 55th fought off all assaults during the day". The historians Jack Horsfall and Nigel Cave wrote "the 55th Division faced four German divisions", was forced "to fall back almost four thousand yards... but it had acted as a sturdy anchor in holding the basis of the British position steady".

=== Cambrai court of inquiry ===
While the line outside of Épehy was not broken, the loss of terrain was a cause of concern for the Army. The historian Bryn Hammond wrote that "the German counter-attack was a major shock for the British" and had included "concerning stories of mobs of men fleeing in the face of the German attacks and, in the process, throwing away their arms". On 21 January 1918, a court of inquiry was convened. It called 25 witnesses to investigate the reasons for the German success, in addition to—per McCartney—"the collapse of a previously 'first rate fighting division' ". The inquiry admitted the Germans were able to achieve surprise because of a thick mist, and that the division's position had become untenable since it had been forced to remove artillery to bolster other units. The inquiry was critical of the division's lack of defence in depth and training. The latter point was blamed on the alleged ill-trained drafts the division had received to replace the more than 7,000 casualties it had previously suffered. The historian William Moore indicated that the majority of the witnesses called by the inquiry were low ranking, and they testified that the numbers of soldiers reported to have been seen retreating had been exaggerated. Gunner Petty, the lowest ranking witness called, reported that the majority of men he saw retreating were artillerymen. Based on their cap badges, he stated they were not from the 55th Division, and he did not see men from the 55th Division retreating. Moore wrote it was "small wonder" Petty had witnessed this after it was established that the relevant field batteries were too close to the front, and "liable to be enfiladed or taken in reverse at easy range". Moore argued Petty's testimony was "unsensational in its content", and "must have been encouraging to... Jeudwine whose Lancashire Territorials had looked like being saddled with the blame for the collapse".

Hammond wrote the 25 witnesses did not include the relevant corps commanders or staff rendering the "value of the exercise questionable". Hammond argued that the inquiry, as well as prior investigations, clouded and influenced the story of the battle for over 30 years. Hammond wrote, "Jeudwine's division was exhausted and considerably weakened in numbers and ought to have been relieved" prior to the German counter-attack. Furthermore, the "initial German bombardment was so violent many front-line defenders had little or no opportunity to defend themselves before they were overwhelmed" by the rapid German advance, but acquitted themselves well where they could. Watson wrote that the division's "exhaustion caused by the heavy fighting and appalling conditions" was the reason for their conduct. The historian Tim Travers wrote that the reasons for the success of the German counter-attack "are not hard to find, and they principally relate to command failures on the part of GHQ and Third Army, who did not anticipate the attack, believing the Germans not to be capable of a major effort". Jeudwine warned of the attack, but VII Corps failed to co-ordinate their defence with flanking units. Travers wrote, "when the warnings of the attack came from 55 Division, these warnings ran into greater and greater resistance the higher they went. Hence, the divisional level was caught in the inability of the corps and army structures to communicate with each other." The use of infiltration tactics by the Germans was also ignored. Smithers wrote the inquiry blamed junior officers and below, holding "no officer of field rank or above ... to blame for anything". Smithers mused "one cannot wonder at the contempt this document excited once its contents became known" and wrote that Louis Oldfield (a senior officer within the 51st (Highland) Division) "probably spoke for everybody ..: 'The result of the Cambrai inquiry is very misleading and discreditable. Someone ought to be kicked'".

=== Early 1918 ===
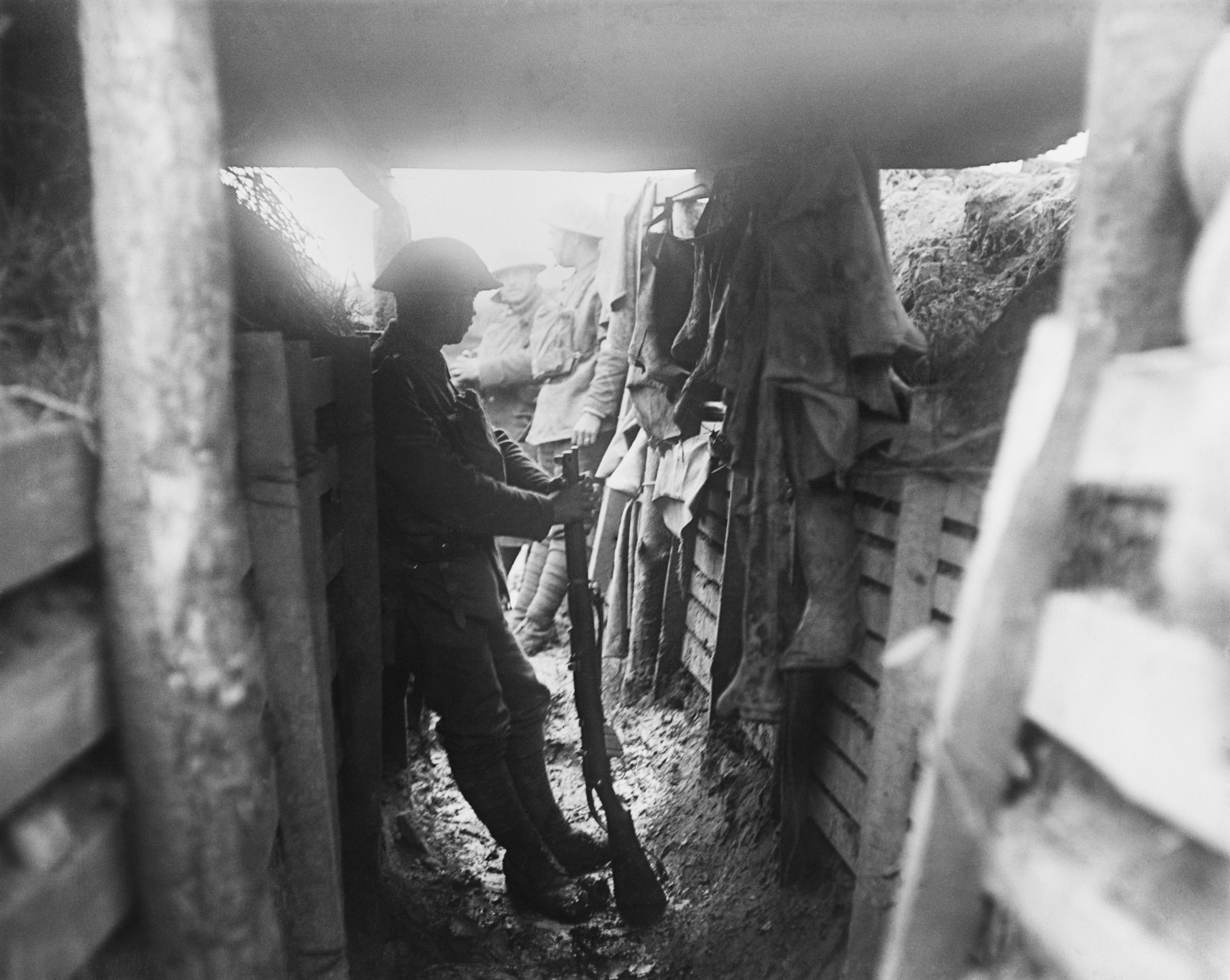
A 1/7KR soldier in a covered trench in the La Bassée sector, March 1918

After Cambrai, the division was assigned to I Corps, part of the First Army, and moved to the Bomy area for rest and training. In anticipation of a German attack, the 1/4SL (the divisional pioneers) and Royal Engineers (RE) fortified the defences in the Givenchy–Festubert sector. By 1918, the number of front line infantry within the British Army in France had decreased because of casualties and a lack of eligible replacements, which had resulted in a manpower crisis. To consolidate manpower and to increase the ratio of machine guns and artillery support available to the infantry, the number of battalions in a brigade was decreased from four to three, leaving a division with nine battalions in place of twelve. This reduced the establishment of a division from 18,825 men to 16,035. An attempt was made to consolidate battalions from the same regiment within the same brigade. The Liverpool Irish (164th Brigade), the 1/9KR (165th Brigade), and the 1/5LR (166th Brigade) were transferred to the 57th (2nd West Lancashire) Division to be merged with second-line units. The artillery was also reorganised: the third medium trench mortar battery was divided between the other two, and the heavy trench mortar battery became a corps asset on 29 January.

On 15 February, the division returned to the frontline. It replaced the 42nd (East Lancashire) Division northeast of Festubert. The first skirmish followed two days later, when a 30-strong German party attempted to raid a sector of the line. This attack was repulsed. A further raid was launched on 7 March, which was also driven off, but not before the 1/5SL suffered 43 casualties. The same day, a further divisional reorganisation took place. The brigade and divisional machine gun companies were consolidated, with the formation of the divisional machine gun battalion.

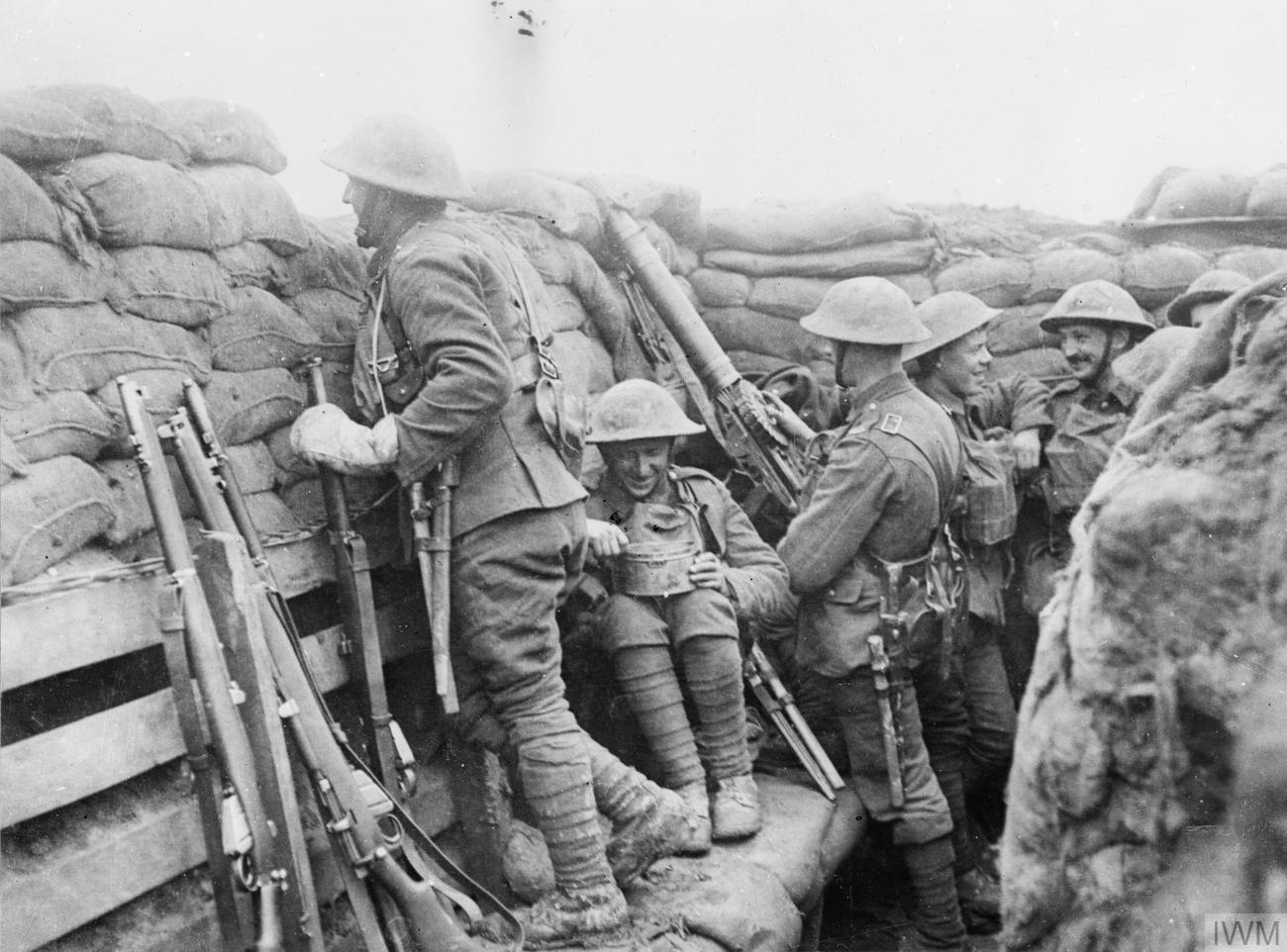
Men of the 1/7KR in the trenches of the La Bassée sector, March 1918

In early March, military intelligence had established that the Germans had vastly increased their artillery presence in the area and believed an attack would fall on the Portuguese Expeditionary Corps, on the division's left. The 55th Division's reserves were tasked with reinforcing the Portuguese in such an event. On 18 March, the 1/5KR raided the German front line and found the trenches deserted. A second raid, on 25 March, penetrated into the reserve line, which was found occupied. The raid took nine prisoners, captured a machine gun, and suffered several wounded.

On 21 March, Germany launched the opening salvo of their Spring Offensive, which aimed to deliver a single, decisive, war-winning blow. The initial attack was in the Saint-Quentin area. The intent was to inflict such a defeat upon the British Armies that the country would abandon the war, which would force the French to sue for peace. Aware of a pending German offensive, the division prepared, which included a reorganisation of the front line, and artillery bombardments of German positions. The latter also included the use of 500 gas shells. Nightly patrols were conducted, with the division able to enter the German front line continually without encountering opposition. On 8 April, the 166th Brigade was ordered to relieve the Portuguese brigade on the left of the division; the handover was scheduled for 9 April. At this time, the 164th Brigade held positions on the right of the division between the La Bassée Canal and a point north of Givenchy (the 1/7KR on the right, the 1/5KR on the left, and the 1/6KR in both support and reserve positions); from which the 165th Brigade held the line north to Festubert (the 1/4KORL on the right, the 1/4LR on the left, with the 2/5LF in support). Coop described the infantry as being tasked with "hold[ing] their posts to the last, no matter whether outflanked or surrounded" and with launching "immediate local counter-attack[s]", which had been rehearsed in training exercises.

=== Defence of Givenchy ===
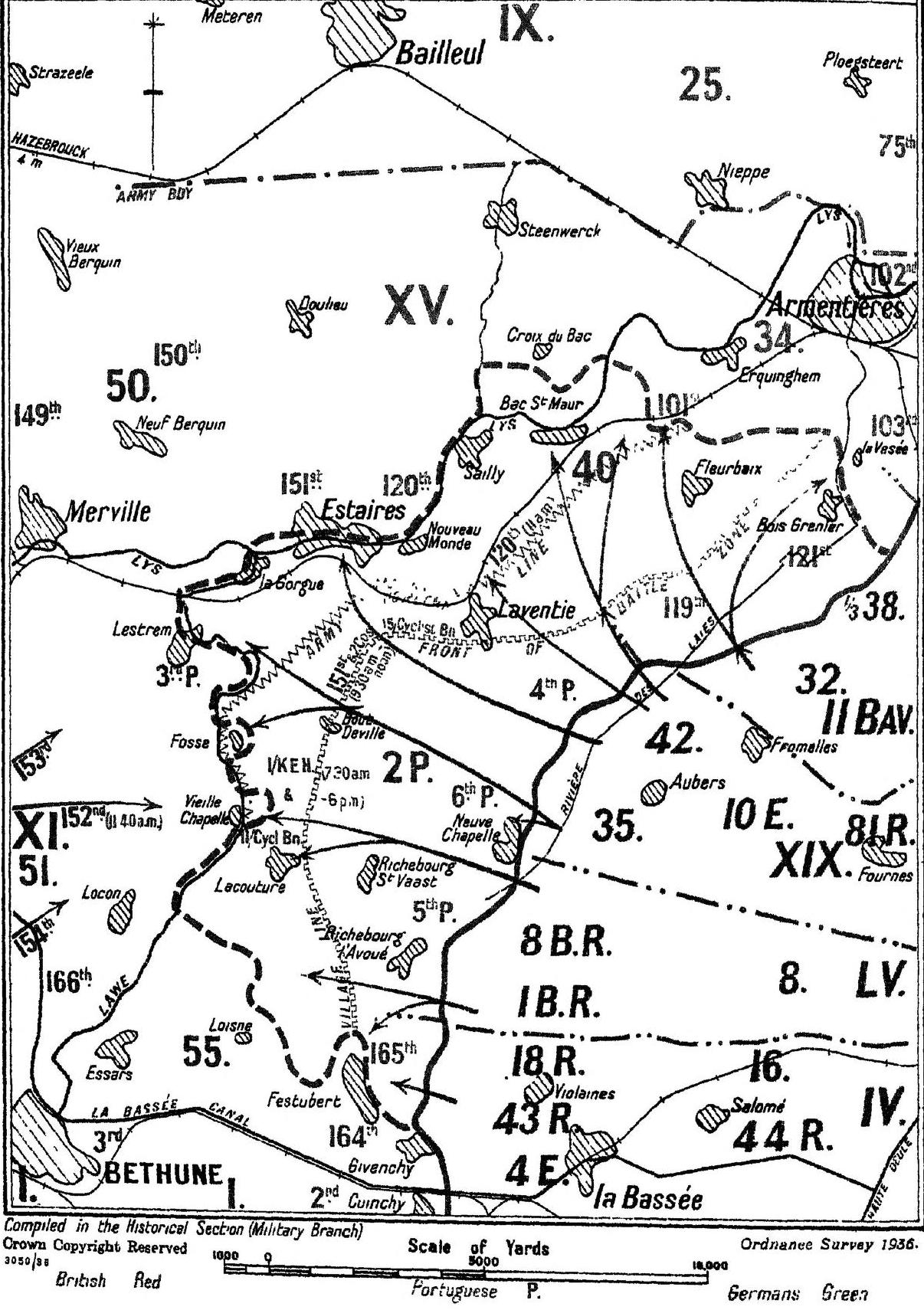
German attack against XI and XV Corps, 9 April.

When the opening attack of the Spring Offensive did not achieve the desired result, the Germans shifted their effort north to the Ypres sector to strike again. At 04:15 on 9 April, the Germans bombarded the division, this marked the beginning of Operation Georgette. The engagement in the southern part of the Allied line became known as the Battle of Estaires. The overall German bombardment achieved the greatest concentration of German guns during the entire war. On the 55th Division's sector, the front line was shelled as well as transportation routes in the divisional rear, as far back as Locon. At that point, it was believed that the Germans had launched a large-scale raid upon the Portuguese. Rather than a raid, the Portuguese division had collapsed under the weight of the full-scale attack, and rendered the 55th's flank exposed.

At 09:00, the German 4th Ersatz, the 43rd Reserve, and the 18th Reserve Divisions launched an attack upon the 55th Division's 4,000-yard (3,700 m) front line. The German divisions had circulated a report that stated the "English 55th Division", after its prior battles had been "described by prisoners ... as a Division ... that is below the average quality". Mist limited visibility to 30 yards (27 metres), and hindered the British ability to repulse the attack. German infantry pushed through the front line between strongpoints held by the 164th Brigade and within half an hour assaulted the 1/4LR battalion headquarters. The bypassed British front-line positions, now surrounded, held out and impeded the German effort. Local counter-attacks resulted in the reoccupation of most of the territory lost by the early afternoon, and forward posts had been retaken at dusk. By the end of the day, the brigade had reclaimed its entire sector. Second Lieutenant John Schofield, of the 2/5LF, earned the VC for his actions during the brigade's fighting.

At 09:50, the Germans attacked the 165th Brigade, having moved around their flank after the defeat of the Portuguese. The Germans pushed through the brigade's forward positions, but their attack was disrupted by the resistance of bypassed garrisons. The German attack only partially broke through the brigade's main line of resistance in one place, and a local counter-attack quickly restored the position. Repeated attacks were launched on the brigade throughout the afternoon. The brigade was reinforced with several infantry companies from the 166th Brigade, and stopped the Germans from making headway. For his actions during this battle, Second Lieutenant Joseph Henry Collin, of the 1/4KORL, was posthumously awarded the VC.

The 166th Brigade, held in reserve, moved to reinforce the Portuguese, and was subjected to artillery fire in the process. As it advance, three of the brigade's battalions were ordered to reinforce the division's other two brigades. Only the 166th's 1/5KORL battalion arrived in what had been the Portuguese's area, during the afternoon, and was now the open left flank of the 165th Brigade. The battalion immediately occupied a tactically vital defensive position, and was reinforced by elements of the divisional pioneer battalion and RE companies. The 51st (Highland) Division's 154th Brigade was attached to the division, and took up defensive positions around Locon, behind the 1/5KORL, the engineers and pioneers. The 154th Brigade's 1/4th Battalion, Seaforth Highlanders reinforced the 166th Brigade, and moved forward to support the 1/5KORL and divisional troops. During the day, several unsuccessful German attacks were made against the 166th Brigade. Historian Don Farr wrote that the division's efforts, in conjunction with other divisions in the area, had forced major delays on the German assault plan, "their plan had called for them to be across the River Lys along the whole length of their assault" by the end of the day, instead they had made only minor gains.

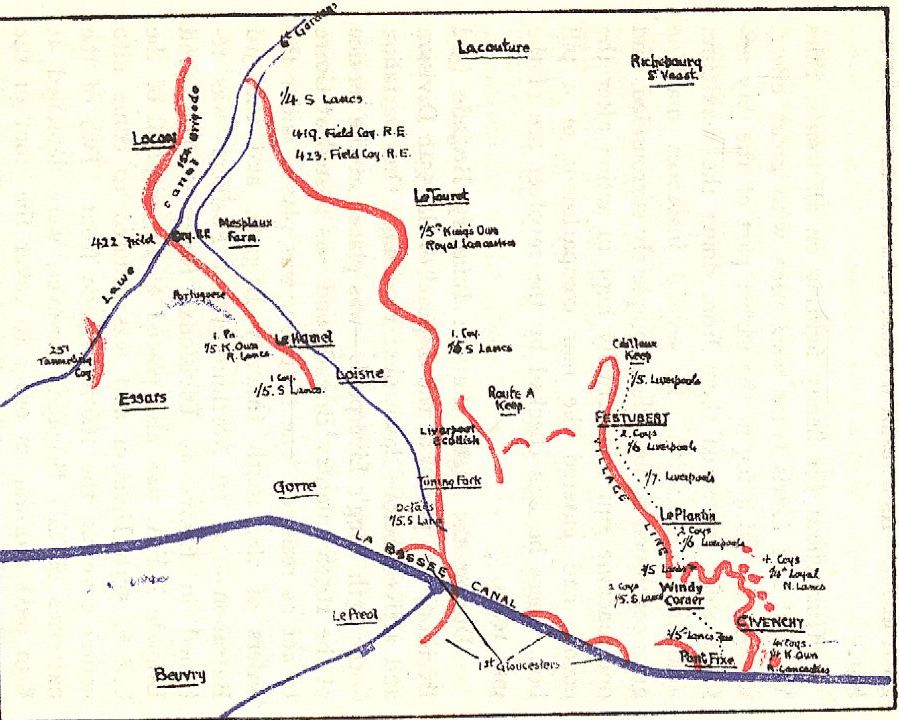
The 55th Division's positions (red lines), at midnight on 9 April.

Before dawn on 10 April, the 3rd Division's 9th Brigade and elements of the 42nd Brigade Royal Field Artillery were attached to the division. The artillery supported the 166th Brigade. One battalion of the 9th Brigade was placed in divisional reserve, and the remaining two were attached to the 164th and 165th Brigades. The German attacks resumed at 07:40, and were supplemented by an intense artillery barrage. Despite fierce fighting throughout the day, the German attack failed. The last German attack of that day occurred in the evening, and managed to make a temporary lodgement before it was repulsed by counter-attacks. Coop described the evening shelling, with defensive positions being "subjected to a terrific bombardment with shells of heavy calibre ... [that] were practically obliterated".

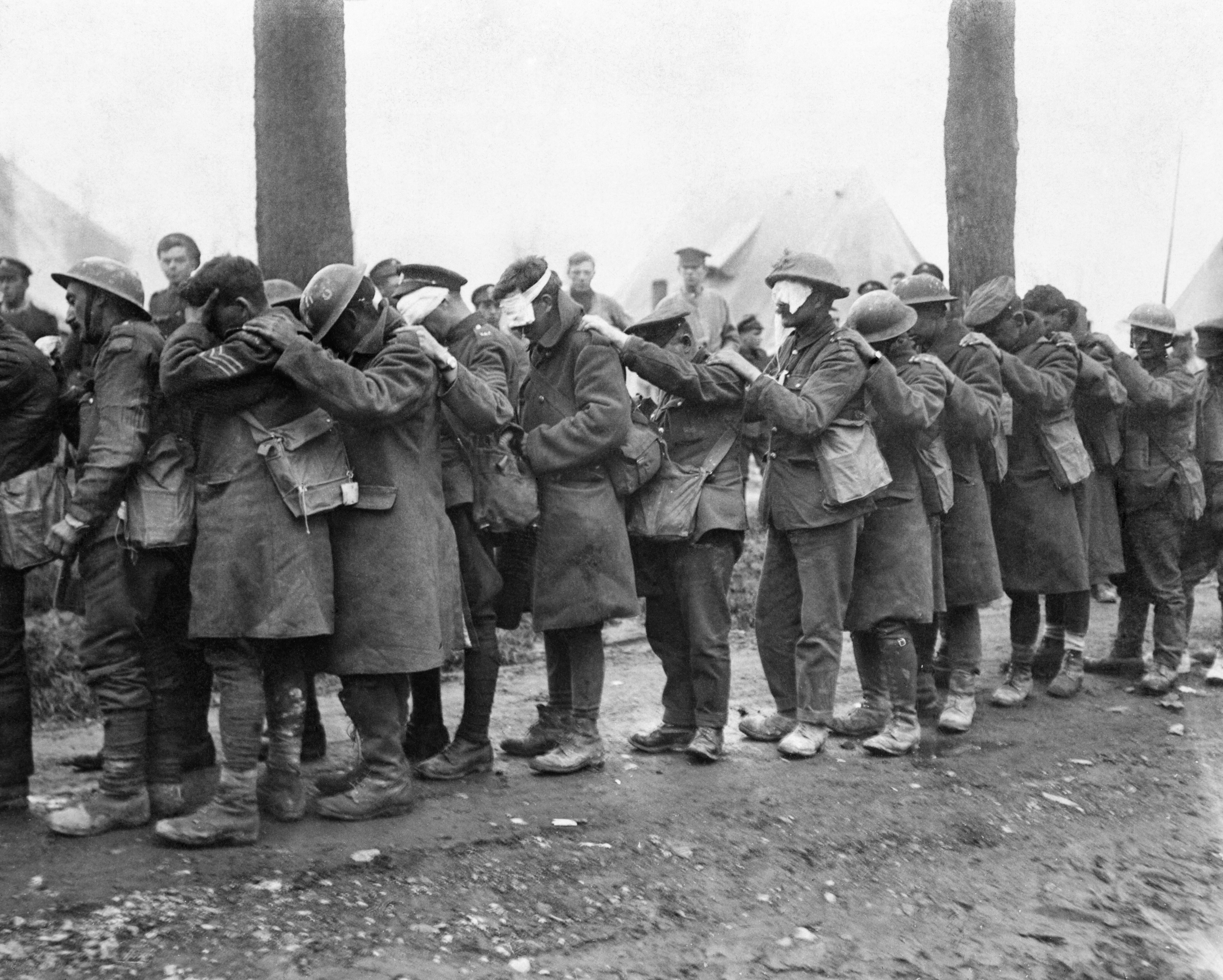
Members of the division, blinded by poison gas on 10 April 1918.

During 11 April, both sides bombarded one another, and two major German infantry attacks were launched by elements of four divisions: the 4th Ersatz, the 18th Reserve, the 43rd Reserve, and the 44th Reserve Divisions. Despite back and forth fighting, the division held its positions. Except for mutual artillery bombardments, fighting died down. This was the result of the German commanders shifting the focus of their attack further north, after failing to breach the British defences in this sector. Between 14 and 17 April, the division was relieved by the 1st and the 3rd Divisions, and moved to the Auchel area for rest. The divisional artillery remained on the front in support. Divisional losses ranged between 3,119 and 3,871. German losses are reported to have been heavy, with almost 1,000 prisoners taken by the division along with the capture of 70 machine guns.

Coop wrote "it was afterwards publicly stated by an officer of the German General Staff that the stand made by the Division on 9 April and the days which followed marked the final ruination of the supreme German effort of 1918". The historian David T. Zabecki wrote that Givenchy was "one of the most impressive defensive battles of the war", where the division "stubbornly held on and never gave way" that "diverted [German] resources and combat power away from the main effort". After his experience at Ypres, Jeudwine had contributed his ideas on defensive tactics to an unpublished army pamphlet in December 1917. McCartney wrote "the ideas developed there contributed directly to the success of the stand of the 55th Division at Givenchy" and "the plans, sketches and narrative of the Battle of Givenchy were subsequently circulated to other divisions as an example of good defensive practice". McCartney concluded Jeudwine had contributed to the tactical doctrine changes within the British Army.

=== Local attacks in the Givenchy sector ===
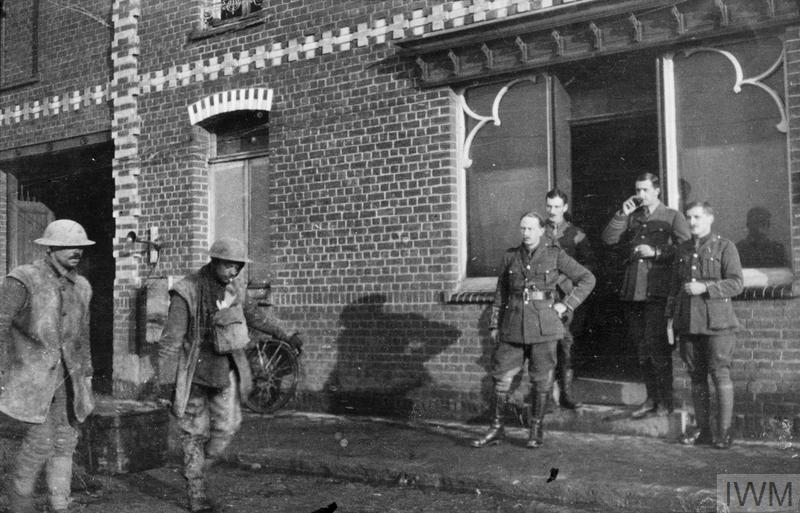
Officers, of the 1/4KORL, watch men carrying rations through a street in Givenchy, May 1918.

On 21 April, French Prime Minister (and Minister of War) Georges Clemenceau visited the division. Over the following days, the 55th relieved the 1st Division and returned to their prior sector of the front line. On 24 and 25 April, several raids were conducted with mixed result and the capture of 30 Germans. For his actions on 25 April, Lance-Corporal James Hewitson, of the 1/4KORL, earned the VC.

On 2 May, German air activity increased. Intelligence gathered from prisoners and deserters stated an attack would occur around 9 May. In response, the divisional artillery increased their shelling of German positions. This resulted in the destruction of an ammunition dump on 8 May, and of a church used as an observation post the next day. By 15 May, no attack had materialised; per Coop, the result of Spanish flu spreading among the Germans. Between 4 and 5 June, the Germans bombarded Beuvry, Givenchy, and Labourse with Yellow Cross gas shells. Prisoners again reported an impending attack, but it likewise did not take place. On 8 June, the division conducted a raid on their German counterparts to gather intelligence, but the attack was repulsed. With the exception of sporadic raiding, the sector remained quiet. Also in June, Major Clement Attlee, who was later Prime Minister of the United Kingdom from 1945 to 1951, joined the 1/5SL, having previously served at Gallipoli and in Mesopotamian campaigns.

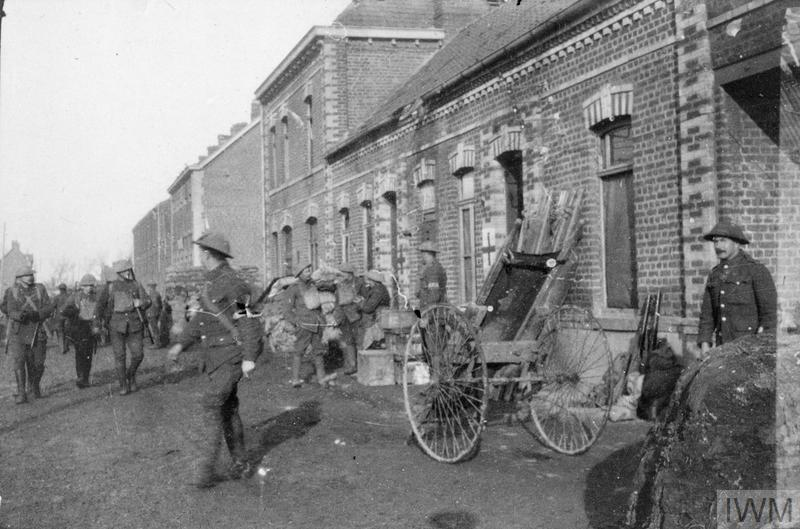
A dressing station in a village behind the Givenchy sector, May 1918

After several weeks of limited action, the 164th Brigade launched an attack on 24 August. They captured some previously lost forward positions, and advanced the front by 200 yards (180 metres). The brigade lost 103 casualties in the process, and took 44 prisoners. The Germans contested this capture with minor actions, and bombarded the position that included the use of gas. Four days later, the 166th occupied additional positions having found them deserted.

To the south, the Allied armies launched the Battle of Amiens. This marked the start of the Hundred Days Offensive, the final offensive of the war. The Germans in the division's sector began to withdraw. The 55th Division was ordered to prepare for a rapid pursuit, in the event of a full-scale retreat, and were informed not to worry about maintaining an unbroken line if they did advance. Nevertheless, throughout September back-and-forth fighting, including increasingly brutal hand-to-hand combat, took place over the same contested ground as local German resistance continued. In anticipation of a German retreat, I Corps ordered a general advance to begin 30 September. After 24 hours of artillery fire, the 1/4LR (166th Brigade) attacked. They were initially successful and took 48 prisoners, but a counter-attack pushed them back to their start line. The battalion made a second attempt on 1 October, and held their objective. From the beginning of September through to 1 October, the division had advanced 4,000 yards (3,700 metres) on their left flank, and 2,500 yards (2,300 metres) on the right. They had also taken 308 prisoners and captured 17 machine guns.

=== Advance into Belgium ===
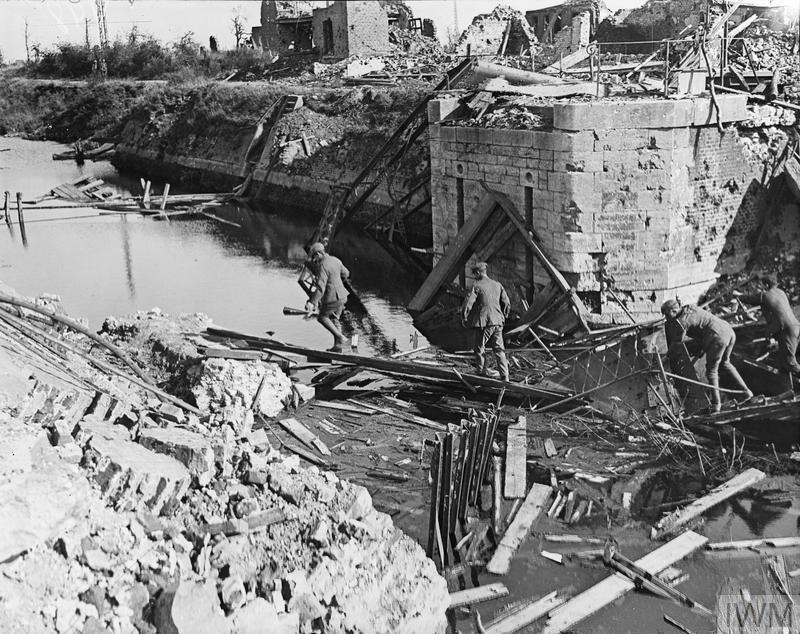
A La Bassée canal bridge destroyed by retreating German troops, pictured the day after the 2/5LF (164th Brigade) captured the town.

In anticipation of a German retreat, cavalry, RE, machine-gun, and medical support units were attached to the two brigades at the front line, a practice that continued for the rest of the campaign. In addition, personnel from RE tunnelling companies were attached to investigate and disarm booby traps. Following the capture of a German officer, who revealed that a German withdrawal to the Canal de la Deûle had begun, the 164th and 166th Brigades advanced on 2 October. The advance of neighbouring divisions was mainly uncontested, but German resistance held up the 55th at La Bassée for much of the day. By the end of 4 October, the division had moved over 5 miles (8 kilometres) and was 500 yards (460 metres) from the canal.

The Germans were entrenched on the east side of the canal, supported by large numbers of machine-guns. They had destroyed most bridges and started the process of flooding the low ground to the west of the canal. On the west side of the canal, the Germans manned several pillboxes and occupied the railway embankment near Don Station. The division bombarded the German positions, and attacked to capture the positions on the west side of the canal. These attacks were initially successful, but German counterattacks retook the lost territory and captured two platoons. On 8 October, the division was transferred to the III Corps of the Fifth Army. The area around Don Station was raided on 14 October, and an attempt to force the canal that night was repulsed. Patrols the next morning, dispatched after it had been reported the Germans had withdrawn, found the Germans were still occupying the positions on the west side of the canal. The next day, the 164th Brigade fought against determined resistance to clear those positions, and the division started crossing the canal that night.

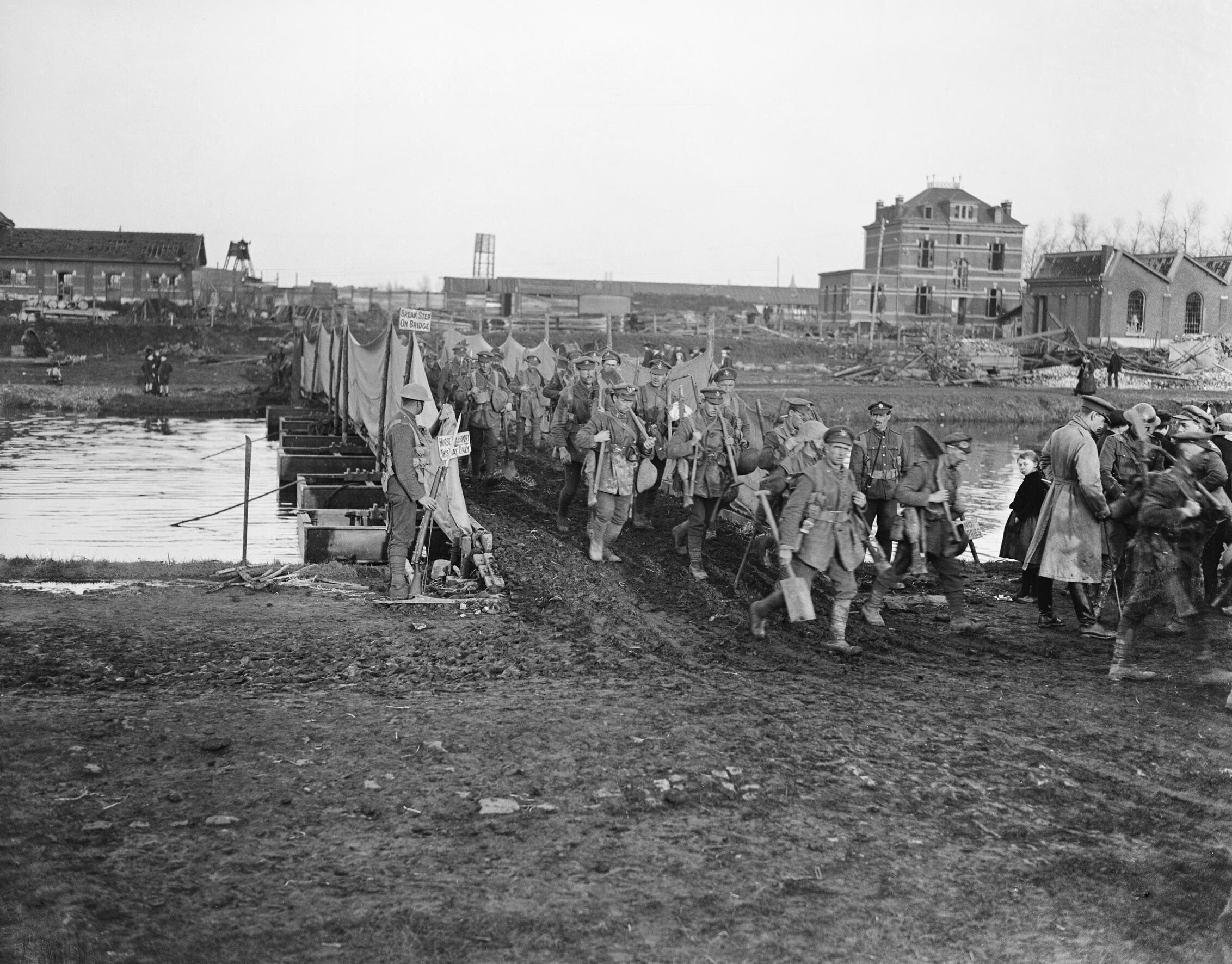
Men of 1/4SL (divisional pioneers) crossing a pontoon bridge over the Scheldt at Tournai, 9 November 1918.

With the canal crossed, the division advanced and liberated several villages. The River Marque was crossed on 18 October, after the division overcame strong resistance. By the end of the next day, the division was close to the Belgian border, which it crossed on 20 October. Later that day, it captured a German divisional ammunition column at Froidmont, southwest of Tournai. The advance continued until 22 October, when the division met heavy resistance on the outskirts of Tournai. This was viewed as a larger effort by the Germans to maintain their positions west of the town. A minor attack was conducted on 25 October, but the gains made were lost following a German counter-attack. No major fighting took place for the remainder of the month, with activity limited to raids and artillery fire from both sides. On 8 November, captured prisoners stated the Germans had withdrawn to the east bank of the Scheldt. As a result, the division advanced largely unopposed to take up positions on the west bank; the 1/6KR entered the western half of Tournai, to the jubilation of its inhabitants. During the night, the division crossed the river. Despite sporadic fighting, the division pushed forward and captured Ath. On 11 November, the armistice came into effect and ended the war. The division had advanced over 50 miles (80 km) in the prior 80 days. From 27 September to the armistice, the division suffered 180 casualties.

=== End of the war ===
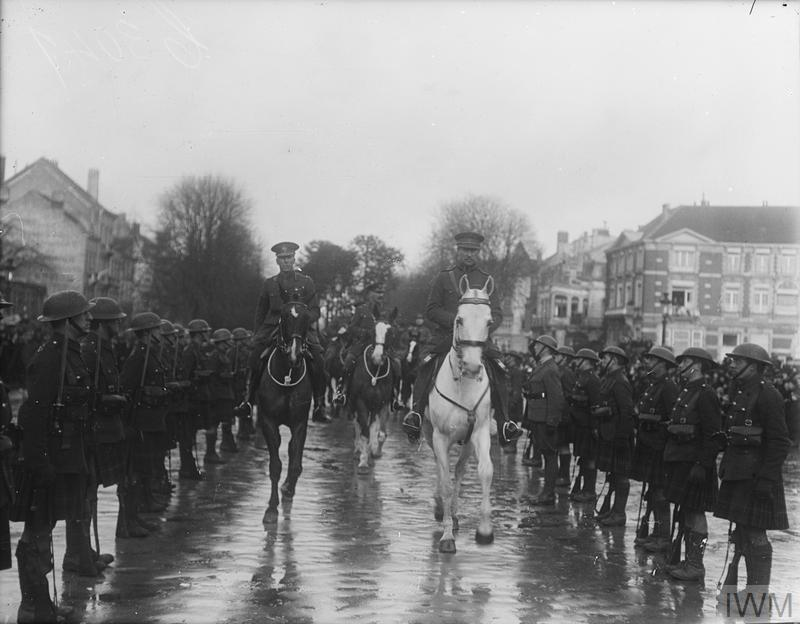
Albert I and Jeudwine arrive on horseback to review the division in the Bois de la Cambre, Brussels, January 1919.

The division received orders on 15 November to move into Germany with the Second Army, but six days later the order was rescinded and the division transferred to the Fifth Army. During the second half of the month, the division rebuilt railways and roads around Leuze-en-Hainaut. A comrades' association for the veterans of the division was established in early December. The British king, George V, reviewed the division on 7 December. Soon afterwards, it relocated to Brussels and the division's personnel filled the time with lectures, educational courses, and athletic competitions. During January 1919, King Albert I of Belgium reviewed the division. It sent representatives to a Brussels ceremonial parade, while demobilisation reduced its numbers. Jeudwine departed on 15 March, to command an Army of Occupation division. By the end of April, the division numbered 158 officers and 2,192 men. It was disbanded shortly afterwards, although not all personnel were demobilised. For example, the Liverpool Scottish had a large number of men not eligible for immediate demobilisation. They were sent to Antwerp, with the Army of Occupation, to maintain a receiving camp for cadres returning to England via Antwerp for demobilisation. They remained there until demobilised at the completion of their task in November. In April 1920, the division reformed in Lancashire.

=== Casualties and honours ===
Between January 1916 and November 1918, 6,520 of the division's officers and men were killed, 24,294 wounded, and 4,887 were reported missing. This was more than half of the 63,923 individuals who had served with the division during this period. Due to the way new drafts were sent to the division and despite the heavy losses, the 55th was able to maintain its link to the Lancashire area. Mitchinson, in analysing losses suffered during the fighting on the Somme, found only eight per cent of the division's casualties came from outside of the Lancashire area. Likewise, in reviewing the losses suffered at Ypres and Cambrai, "the policy of posting local men whenever possible continued and although there were men, especially in 165 Brigade, from Staffordshire, Surrey and Suffolk, the great majority of non-West Lancashire soldiers came from Cumberland or East Lancashire".

For acts of valour, eleven individuals earned the VC (in some cases posthumously), with Chavasse earning a bar for a second award. In addition, the division had the following awards bestowed on its members (in several cases, multiple times): 80 Distinguished Service Orders, 427 Military Crosses, 200 Distinguished Conduct Medals, 1,649 Military Medals, and 70 Meritorious Service Medals.

== War memorials ==
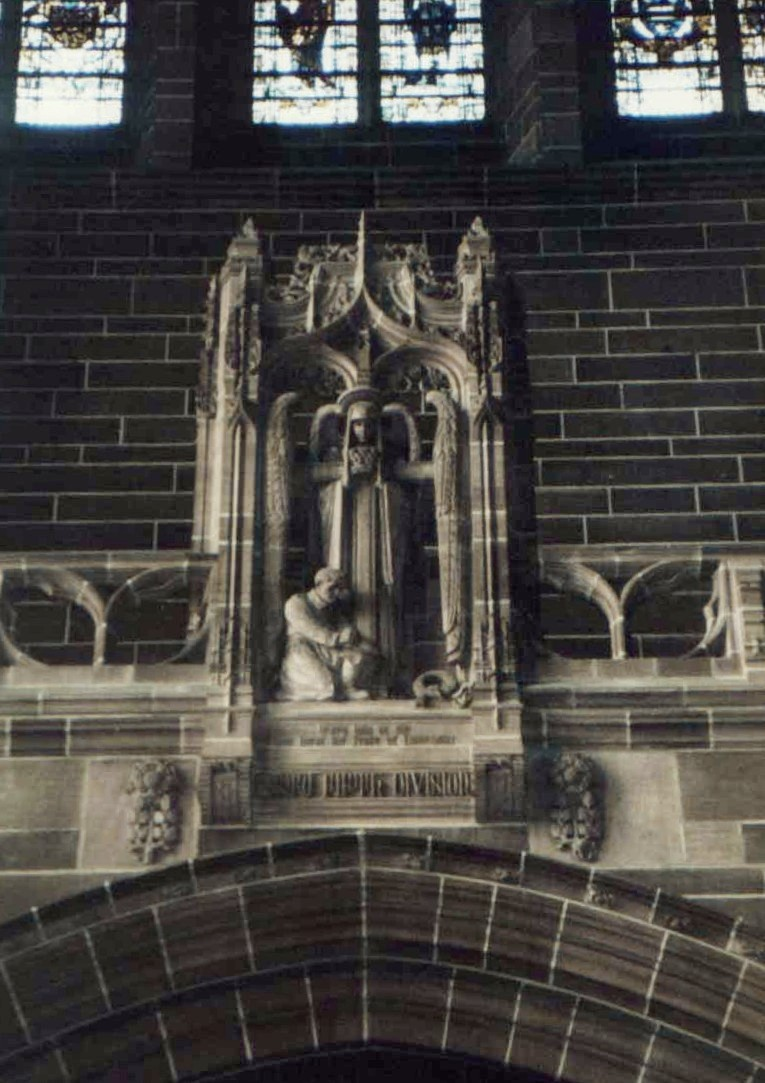
The division memorial in Liverpool. The corbels represent tank treads. The sculpture depicts an angel with a cross holding a crown above a kneeling soldier, with the divisional motto in relief.

In September 1919, the division's comrades' association decided that two memorials would be erected: one in Liverpool, and a second in Givenchy-lès-la-Bassée. The memorial in France was constructed on land near the town's church and unveiled on 15 May 1921. The ceremony included an honour guard of division veterans, including Jeudwine, and guests including the Duchess of Sutherland, the Lord Mayor of Liverpool, Marshal of France Joseph Joffre, and the mayors of Givenchy and other nearby towns. The second (pictured), is a sandstone sculpture by Walter Gilbert that was installed in Liverpool Cathedral.

== Battle insignia ==
The practise of wearing battalion specific insignia (often called battle patches) in the BEF began in mid-1915, and became widespread after the Battle of the Somme. The patches shown below were adopted on 30 March 1916, and were worn on the back below the collar. The division sign was worn on the sleeves, when introduced in May 1917. The division was unusual within British formations, for extending battle patches to the engineers and artillery units.

164th Brigade, from left to right, top row: the 1/4KORL, the Liverpool Irish, the 2/5LF, the 1/4LR. Bottom row: the 164th Machine Gun Company, the 164th Trench Mortar Battery.
165th Brigade, from left to right, top row: the 1/5KR, the 1/6KR, the 1/7KR, the 1/9KR. Bottom row: the 165th Machine Gun Company, the 165th Trench Mortar Battery.
166th Brigade, from left to right, top row: the 1/5KORL, the Liverpool Scottish, the 1/5SL, the 1/5LR. Bottom row: the 166th Machine Gun Company, the 166th Trench Mortar Battery.
Divisional engineers, from left to right: the 429th Field Company RE, the 422nd Field Company RE, the 423rd Field Company RE, the 1/4SL.
Divisional artillery, from left to right:the 275th Brigade RFA, the 276th Brigade RFA, the 55th Divisional Ammunition Column.

== Order of battle ==
West Lancashire Division (1910)

North Lancashire Brigade

- 4th Battalion, King's Own (Royal Lancaster Regiment)
- 5th Battalion, King's Own (Royal Lancaster Regiment)
- 4th Battalion, Loyal North Lancashire Regiment
- 5th Battalion, Loyal North Lancashire Regiment

Liverpool Brigade

- 5th Battalion, King's (Liverpool Regiment)
- 6th (Rifle) Battalion, King's (Liverpool Regiment)
- 7th Battalion, King's (Liverpool Regiment)
- 8th (Irish) Battalion, King's (Liverpool Regiment)

South Lancashire Brigade

- 9th Battalion, King's (Liverpool Regiment)
- 10th (Scottish) Battalion, King's (Liverpool Regiment)
- 4th Battalion, South Lancashire Regiment
- 5th Battalion, South Lancashire Regiment

Divisional Troops

- Divisional artillery, Royal Field Artillery
  - 1st West Lancashire Brigade
    - 1st Lancashire Battery
    - 2nd Lancashire Battery
    - 3rd Lancashire Battery
    - 1st West Lancashire Ammunition Column
  - 2nd West Lancashire Brigade
    - 9th Lancashire Battery
    - 10th Lancashire Battery
    - 11th Lancashire Battery
    - 2nd West Lancashire Ammunition Column
  - 3rd West Lancashire Brigade
    - 12th Lancashire Battery
    - 13th Lancashire Battery
    - 14th Lancashire Battery
    - 3rd West Lancashire Ammunition Column
  - 4th West Lancashire Brigade
    - 7th Lancashire Battery
    - 8th Lancashire Battery
    - 4th West Lancashire Ammunition Column
- West Lancashire Royal Garrison Artillery
- Divisional engineers, Royal Engineers
  - 1st West Lancashire Field Company
  - 2nd West Lancashire Field Company
  - West Lancashire Divisional Transport and Supply Column
  - West Lancashire Divisional Telegraph Company
- Royal Army Medical Corps
  - 1st West Lancashire Field Ambulance
  - 2nd West Lancashire Field Ambulance
  - 3rd West Lancashire Field Ambulance

West Lancashire Division (August 1914)

North Lancashire Brigade (left in April 1915, and became the 154th Brigade)

- 4th Battalion, King's Own (Royal Lancaster Regiment)
- 5th Battalion, King's Own (Royal Lancaster Regiment) (sent to France, February 1915)
- 4th Battalion, Loyal North Lancashire Regiment
- 5th Battalion, Loyal North Lancashire Regiment (sent to France, February 1915)
- 2/5th Battalion, Lancashire Fusiliers (replaced 5th King's Own)
- 8th Battalion, (Irish) King's Regiment (Liverpool) (from April 1915)

Liverpool Brigade (broken up after battalions sent to France)

- 5th Battalion, King's Regiment (Liverpool) (sent to France, February 1915)
- 6th Battalion, (Rifle) King's Regiment (Liverpool) (sent to France, February 1915)
- 7th Battalion, King's Regiment (Liverpool) (sent to France, March 1915)
- 8th Battalion, (Irish) King's Regiment (Liverpool) (left April 1915)

South Lancashire Brigade (broken up after battalions sent to France)

- 9th Battalion, King's Regiment (Liverpool) (sent to France, March 1915)
- 10th Battalion, (Scottish) King's Regiment (Liverpool) (sent to France, November 1914)
- 4th Battalion, South Lancashire Regiment (sent to France, February 1915)
- 5th Battalion, South Lancashire Regiment (sent to France, February 1915)

Divisional Troops

- Divisional artillery, Royal Field Artillery
  - 1st West Lancashire Brigade
    - 1st, 2nd, and 3rd Lancashire Batteries
  - 2nd West Lancashire Brigade
    - 9th, 10th, and 11th Lancashire Batteries
  - 3rd West Lancashire Brigade
    - 12th, 13th, and 14th Lancashire Batteries
  - 4th West Lancashire (Howitzer) Brigade
    - 7th and 8th Lancashire (Howitzer) Batteries
  - West Lancashire Divisional Ammunition Column (formed in early 1915, from the Brigade Ammunition Columns)
- Divisional artillery, Royal Garrison Artillery
  - 1/1st Lancashire Heavy Battery and Ammunition Column, Royal Garrison Artillery (RGA)
- Divisional engineers, Royal Engineers
  - 1st West Lancashire Field Company (sent to France, January 1915)
  - 2nd West Lancashire Field Company
- West Lancashire Divisional Signal Company
- Royal Army Medical Corps
  - 1st West Lancashire Field Ambulance (left in January 1915)
  - 2nd West Lancashire Field Ambulance
  - 3rd West Lancashire Field Ambulance
- West Lancashire Army Service Corps
  - West Lancashire Divisional Transport and Supply Column
- The Lancashire Hussars (Divisional Cavalry)

55th (West Lancashire) Division (1916–1918)

164th (North Lancashire) Brigade

- 1/4th Battalion, King's Own (Royal Lancaster Regiment)
- 1/4th Battalion, Loyal North Lancashire Regiment
- 2/5th Battalion, Lancashire Fusiliers
- 1/8th (Irish) Battalion, King's (Liverpool Regiment) (left January 1918)
- 164th Machine Gun Company, Machine Gun Corps (formed 19 February 1916, left 7 March 1918)
- 164th Trench Mortar Battery (formed March 1916)

165th (Liverpool) Brigade

- 1/5th Battalion, King's (Liverpool Regiment)
- 1/6th Battalion, King's (Liverpool Regiment)
- 1/7th Battalion, King's (Liverpool Regiment)
- 1/9th Battalion, King's (Liverpool Regiment) (left February 1918)
- 165th Machine Gun Company, Machine Gun Corps (formed 26 February 1916, left 7 March 1918)
- 165th Trench Mortar Battery (formed March 1916)

166th (South Lancashire) Brigade

- 1/10th (Scottish) Battalion, King's (Liverpool Regiment)
- 1/5th Battalion, King's Own (Royal Lancaster Regiment)
- 1/5th Battalion, South Lancashire Regiment
- 1/5th Battalion, Loyal North Lancashire Regiment (left February 1918)
- 166th Machine Gun Company, Machine Gun Corps (formed by 1 March 1916, left 7 March 1918)
- 166th Trench Mortar Battery (formed March 1916)
- 2/10th Battalion, King's (Liverpool Regiment) (joined April 1918, and amalgamated with 1/10th (Scottish) Battalion, King's (Liverpool Regiment) to become 10th Battalion, King's (Liverpool Regiment))

Divisional Mounted Troops

- A Squadron, North Irish Horse (left 10 May 1916)
- C Squadron, King Edward's Horse (attached 25 October – 21 November 1918)
- 55th Divisional Cyclist Company (left 11 May 1916)
- A Company, VIII Corps Cyclist Battalion (attached between 18 October and 18 November 1918)

Divisional Artillery

- 1/I West Lancashire Brigade, Royal Field Artillery (renamed CCLXXV Brigade, 15 May 1916)
  - 1/1st Lancashire Battery (renamed A Battery, 15 May 1916)
  - 1/2nd Lancashire Battery (renamed B Battery, 15 May 1916; broken-up and distributed between A and C Battery, 5 October 1916)
  - 1/3rd Lancashire Battery (renamed C Battery, 15 May 1916))
  - D Battery (formed 7 May; left 23 May 1916)
  - D (Howitzer) Battery (joined, 23 May 1916)
  - B Battery (joined 6 October 1916)
  - 1/I West Lancashire Brigade Ammunition Column (disbanded 18 May 1916)
- 1/II West Lancashire Brigade, Royal Field Artillery (renamed CCLXXVI Brigade, 15 May 1916)
  - 1/9th Lancashire Battery (renamed A Battery, 15 May 1916))
  - 1/10th Lancashire Battery (renamed B Battery, 15 May 1916))
  - 1/11th Lancashire Battery (renamed C Battery, 15 May 1916); broken-up and distributed between A and B Batteries, 4 October 1916)
  - D Battery (joined 23 May 1916)
  - D (Howitzer) Battery (joined 23 May 1916)
  - C (Howitzer) Battery (joined 8 October 1916; broken-up 18 January 1917)
  - C Battery (joined 18 January 1917)
  - 1/II West Lancashire Brigade Ammunition Column (disbanded 18 May 1916)
- 1/III West Lancashire Brigade, Royal Field Artillery (renamed CCLXXVII Brigade, 15 May 1916; left 18 January 1917)
  - 12th Lancashire Battery (renamed A Battery, 15 May 1916; broken-up and distributed between B and C Batteries, 4 October 1916)
  - 13th Lancashire Battery (renamed B Battery, 15 May 1916)
  - 14th Lancashire Battery (renamed C Battery, 15 May 1916)
  - D Battery (joined 23 May 1916)
  - D (Howitzer) Battery (joined 23 May 1916)
  - A Battery (joined 7 October 1916; left 18 January 1917)
  - 1/III West Lancashire Brigade Ammunition Column (disbanded 18 May 1916)
- 1/IV West Lancashire (Howitzer) Brigade, Royal Field Artillery (renamed CCLXXVIII Brigade, 15 May 1916; broken-up and distributed between CCLXXV and CCLXXVI Brigades, 19 October 1916)
  - 1/7th Lancashire (Howitzer) Battery (left 23 May 1916)
  - 1/8th Lancashire (Howitzer) Battery (left 23 May 1916)
  - C (Howitzer) Battery (left 23 May 1916)
  - A Battery (joined 23 May 1916)
  - B Battery (joined 23 May 1916)
  - C Battery (joined 23 May 1916)
  - 1/IV West Lancashire (H) Brigade Ammunition Column (disbanded 18 May 1916)
- 55th (West Lancashire) Divisional Ammunition Column, Royal Field Artillery (joined 17 February 1916)
- X/55 Medium Trench Mortar Battery, Royal Field Artillery (formed by 3 June 1916)
- Y/55 Medium Trench Mortar Battery, Royal Field Artillery (formed by 3 June 1916)
- Z/55 Medium Trench Mortar Battery, Royal Field Artillery (formed by 3 June 1916; broken-up and distributed between X and Y Batteries, 29 January 1918)
- V/55 Heavy Trench Mortar Battery, Royal Garrison Artillery (formed 25 May 1916; left 29 January 1918)

Divisional Engineers

- 1/1st West Lancashire Field Company, Royal Engineers (joined 28 February 1916; numbered 419th Field Company by 1 February 1917)
- 2/1st West Lancashire Field Company, RE (numbered 422nd Field Company by 1 February 1917)
- 2/2nd West Lancashire Field Company, RE (numbered 423rd Field Company by 1 February 1917)
- 55th (West Lancashire) Divisional Signal Company, RE

Divisional Pioneers

- 1/4th Battalion, South Lancashire Regiment

Divisional Machine Guns

- No 55 Battalion, Machine Gun Corps (formed 7 March 1918)
  - 164th MG Company (from 164th Brigade)
  - 165th MG Company (from 165th Brigade)
  - 166th MG Company (from 166th Brigade)
  - 196th MG Company (joined 22 December 1916, as a divisional asset prior to the formation of the battalion)

Divisional Medical Services, Royal Army Medical Corps

- 1/3rd West Lancashire Field Ambulance
- 2/1st West Lancashire Field Ambulance
- 2/1st Wessex Field Ambulance

Divisional Veterinary Services, Army Veterinary Corps

- 1/West Lancashire Mobile Veterinary Section

Divisional Services, Army Service Corps

- 55th Divisional Train
  - 95th Horse Transport Company
  - 96th Horse Transport Company
  - 97th Horse Transport Company
  - 98th Horse Transport Company
- 246th Divisional Employment Company, Labour Corps (joined by 16 June 1917)

== See also ==
- Altcar Training Camp, a training facility that was used by the division.
- Everton Road drill hall
- List of commanders of the British 55th Division
- List of British divisions in World War I
