= List of commanders of the British 55th Division =

West Lancashire Division 55th (West Lancashire) Division 55th (West Lancashire) Motor Division 55th (West Lancashire) Infantry Division
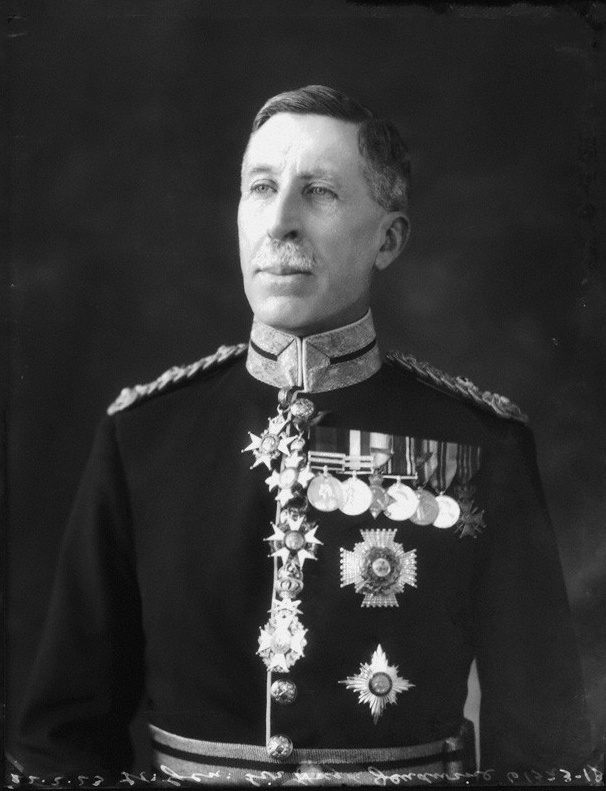
- A portrait of Hugh Jeudwine, the general officer commanding who led the division in combat during the First World War.
- Active: 1908–1945
- Country: United Kingdom
- Branch: Territorial Force (1908–1920); Territorial Army (1921–1945)
- Peacetime HQ: Liverpool
- Engagements: First World War; Second World War

The 55th Division was an infantry division of the British Army, which was first formed in 1902 and finally disbanded in 1945. The division was commanded by a general officer commanding (GOC). In this role, he would receive orders from a level above him in the chain of command, and then use the forces within the division to undertake the mission assigned. In addition to directing the tactical battle the division was involved in, the GOC oversaw a staff and the administrative, logistical, medical, training, and discipline of the division. The 55th Division had 20 different permanent GOCs over its 37–year history.

In the opening years of the 20th century, the British Army implemented a series of reforms based on lessons learnt during the Second Boer War (1899–1902). This included the formation of the Territorial Force in 1907, and the West Lancashire Division the following year. The initial intent for the force, and the division, was to take over the defence of the country when the regular army was abroad on military service. At the time of its creation, territorials were limited to only serving within the UK. As European tensions increased, the Imperial Service Obligation was introduced in 1910. This allowed territorials to volunteer for overseas service, and it was believed that at least one quarter of the men would volunteer for oversea service on the outbreak of war. Following the start of the First World War, in 1914, and through into 1915, those who had volunteered were transferred to formations fighting on Western Front in France. Those who did not volunteer, were used to form the 2nd West Lancashire Division and by April 1915 the West Lancashire Division had ceased to exist. The division was reformed as the 55th (West Lancashire) Division, in France during January 1916. It proceeded to fight in the battles of the Somme, Passchendaele, Cambrai, Estaires, and the Hundred Days Offensive. Between being reformed and the end of hostilities, the division suffered almost 36,000 casualties, with 6,520 men killed. The division was demobilised in Belgium in 1920, and then reformed in the UK.

In 1921, the Territorial Force was reconstituted as the Territorial Army (TA), and the division became part of the latter. In 1938, the 55th was reorganized as a motor division that saw a decrease in infantry and artillery allocated to it, but an increase in motor vehicles. The intended design was for the formation to be able to keep pace with an armoured division, and consolidate territory by the former. As tensions increased between Germany and the United Kingdom and its allies, the TA was expanded in 1939 and the 55th assisted in the creation of the 59th (Staffordshire) Motor Division. During the Second World War, which broke out in September 1939, the division did not leave the United Kingdom. In June 1940, the motor division concept was abandoned, and the division was reorganised as an infantry formation and was then known as the 55th (West Lancashire) Infantry Division. The division was used to defend the UK from a potential German invasion, as a training formation, and a source of reinforcements for formations fighting overseas. The division was also used for deception purposes and was included within the Operation Fortitude effort, to within divert German resources away from Normandy, France, where Allied forces would land to start the process of liberating German-occupied Western Europe. At the end of the war, the remnant of the division was disbanded when the British army demobilised. The TA was reformed in 1947, on a much smaller scale, and did not include the 55th.

== General officer commanding ==
General officer commanding
No.	Appointment date	Rank	General officer commanding	Notes	Source(s)
1	1 April 1908	Major-General	Edward Dickson	The division was formed in Lancashire, England	
2	6 July 1909	Major-General	Edward Bethune		
3	3 June 1912	Major-General	Walter Lindsay	During Lindsay's tenure, the division started to mobilise for the First World War.	
4	5 August 1914	Major-General	Frederick Hammersley	In August, those of the division who volunteered for overseas service were split from those who did not. The latter were grouped together and were used to form the 2nd West Lancashire Division.	
5	3 September 1914	Major-General	John Forster	Between October 1914 and May 1915, the division was used as a source of reinforcements for formations in France, fighting on the Western Front. The division ceased to exist in May, once the final troops were dispatched overseas or sent to join the 2nd West Lancashire Division.	
6	3 January 1916	Major-General	Hugh Jeudwine	The division was reformed as the 55th (West Lancashire) Division, in France, and served on the Western Front for the duration of the war. Following the end of the war, it moved into Belgium where it started to demobilise.	
7	29 May 1919	Major-General	Reginald Barnes	Under Barne's tenure, the division finished demobilising in Belgium. In April 1920, it was reformed in England.	
8	1 April 1921	Major-General	Lothian Nicholson	In 1921, the Territorial Force was reconstituted as the Territorial Army (TA), and the division became part of the TA.	
9	1 April 1925	Major-General	Hugo de Pree		
10	16 July 1926	Major-General	Basil Hitchcock		
11	14 September 1928	Major-General	Harold Higginson		
12	14 September 1932	Major-General	George Weir		
13	1 January 1934	Major-General	James Cooke-Collis		
14	5 December 1935	Major-General	Ernest Lewin		
15	1 June 1938	Major-General	Vivian Majendie	Under Majendie's tenure, the division was reorganised as the 55th (West Lancashire) Motor Division, assisted in the creation of the 59th (Staffordshire) Motor Division, and mobilised for the Second World War.	
16	1 June 1941	Major-General	William Morgan	In June 1940, the motor division concept was abandoned and the division was reorganised as an infantry formation. It was now known as the 55th (West Lancashire) Infantry Division.	
Acting	13 October 1941	Brigadier	Rupert Brett		
17	30 October 1941	Major-General	Frederick Morgan	Starting in late 1941, the division acted as a source of reinforcements for fighting formations overseas.	
18	14 May 1942	Major-General	Hugh Hibbert		
19	15 August 1943	Major-General	Walter Clutterbuck	In December 1943, the division left England and moved to Northern Ireland. During this period, it became part of the Operation Fortitude deception effort. This aimed to divert German resources away from Normandy, France, where Allied forces would land to start the process of liberating German-occupied Western Europe.	
20	13 July 1944	Major-General	Horatio Berney-Ficklin	During July 1944, the division returned to the mainland of the UK. It has also been drained of manpower to the point of being disbanded. The formation was used for training purposes, while also maintaining its deception role. At the end of the war, it was disbanded when the British army demobilised. The TA was reformed in 1947, on a much smaller scale, and did not include the division.	
