= James Hutchinson (VC) =

Recipient of the Victoria Cross

- Born: 9 July 1895; Top Bank, Radcliffe, Lancashire
- Died: 22 January 1972 (aged 76); Torquay, Devon
- Military career
- Allegiance: United Kingdom
- Branch: British Army
- Rank: Corporal
- Units: The Lancashire Fusiliers
- Conflicts: World War I
- Awards: Victoria Cross

James Hutchinson VC (9 July 1895 – 22 January 1972) was an English recipient of the Victoria Cross, the highest and most prestigious award for gallantry in the face of the enemy that can be awarded to British and Commonwealth forces. He was serving with the British Army during the First World War at the time of the award.

Hutchinson was 20 years old, and a private in the 2/5th Battalion, The Lancashire Fusiliers (55th (West Lancashire) Division), British Army on 28 June 1916 when his actions in Ficheux, France earned him the Victoria Cross. His citation reads:

For most conspicuous bravery. During an attack on the enemy's position this soldier was the leading man, and, entering their trench, shot two sentries and cleared two of the traverses. After our object had been gained and retirement ordered, Private Hutchinson, on his own initiative, undertook the dangerous task of covering the retirement, and he did this with such gallantry and determination that the wounded were removed into safety. During all this time this gallant soldier was exposed to fierce fire from machine-guns and rifles at close quarters.

He later achieved the rank of corporal.
