= Hippolyte Langlois =

French general and academician (1839–1912)

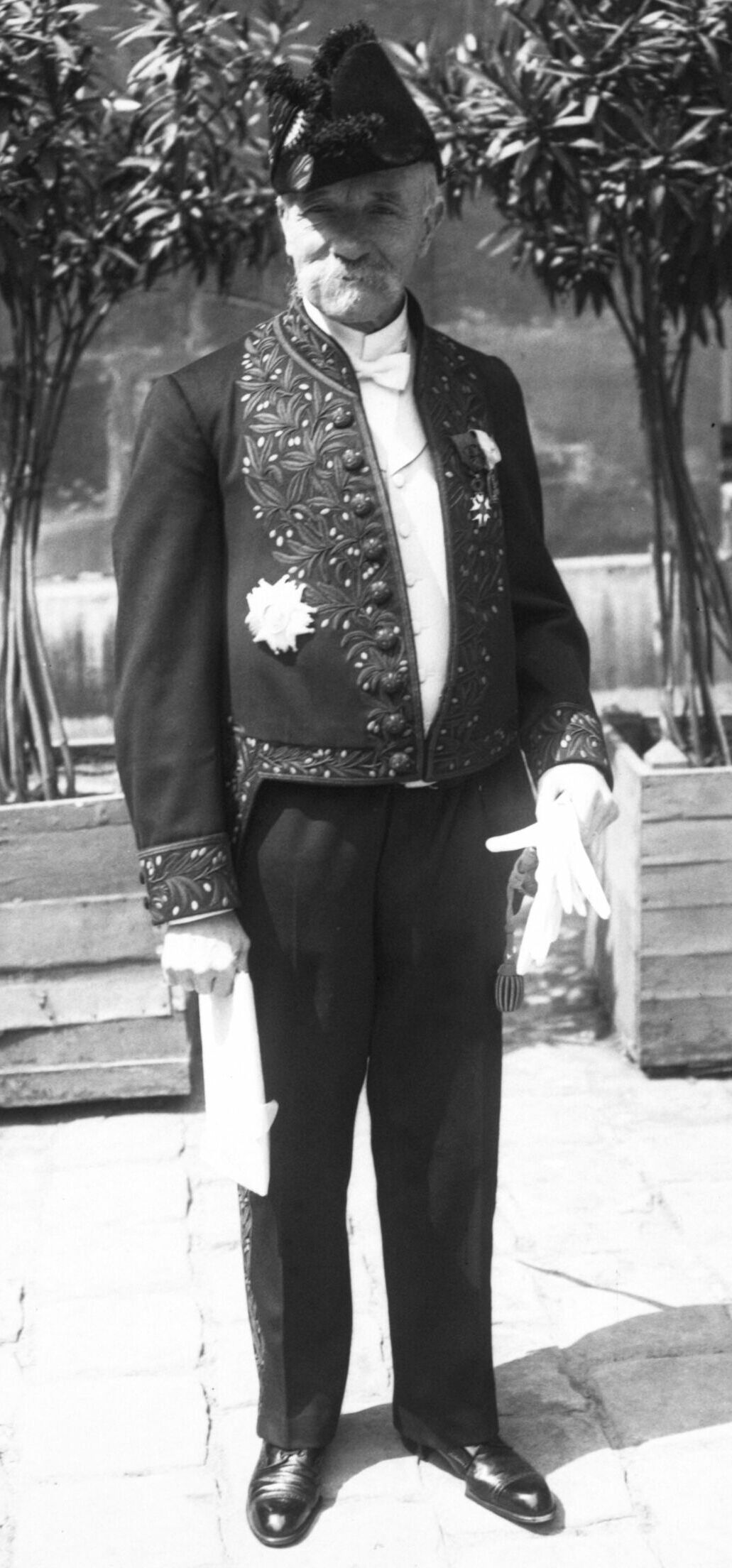
Hippolyte Langlois on the day of his reception at the Académie française in 1911

Hippolyte Langlois (French pronunciation: [ipɔlit lɑ̃ɡlwa]; 3 August 1839 – 12 February 1912) was a French general noted for his writings on military science.

== Biography ==
He was born at Besançon, Doubs, and, after passing through the École polytechnique, was appointed to the artillery as sub-lieutenant in 1858, attaining the rank of captain in 1866. He served in the army of Metz in the Franco-Prussian War. Eight years later he became major, in 1887 lieutenant-colonel and in 1888 colonel. At this time he was appointed professor of artillery at the École de Guerre, and in this post he devoted himself to working out the tactical principles of the employment of field artillery under the new conditions of armament of which he foresaw the advent. Examples included the then developing quick-firing artillery for which he recommended tactics such as the rafale The public result of his work was the great treatise L’Artillerie de campagne (1891–1902), which may still he regarded as the classic of the arm.

In 1894 he became general of brigade, and in 1898 general of division. For two years after this he was the commandant of the École de guerre at the time that the modern French strategic and tactical doctrine was being developed and taught. He was, however, regarded as a leader as well as a theorist, and in 1901 he was selected to command the XX Corps on the German frontier, popularly called the Iron Corps. In 1902 he became a member of the Conseil supérieur de la Guerre, consisting of senior generals marked out for the higher commands in war.

He retired from the active list in 1904 on reaching the age limit, and devoted himself with the greatest energy to critical military literature. In 1907 he began the publication of a monthly journal of military art and history, the Revue militaire generale. In 1911 he was elected to seat 32 in the Académie française.

The most important of his other works are Enseignements de deux guerres récentes and Conséquences tactiques du progrès de l’armement.
