= Hugh Jeudwine =

British Army general (1862–1942)

Lieutenant-General Sir Hugh Jeudwine KCB KBE
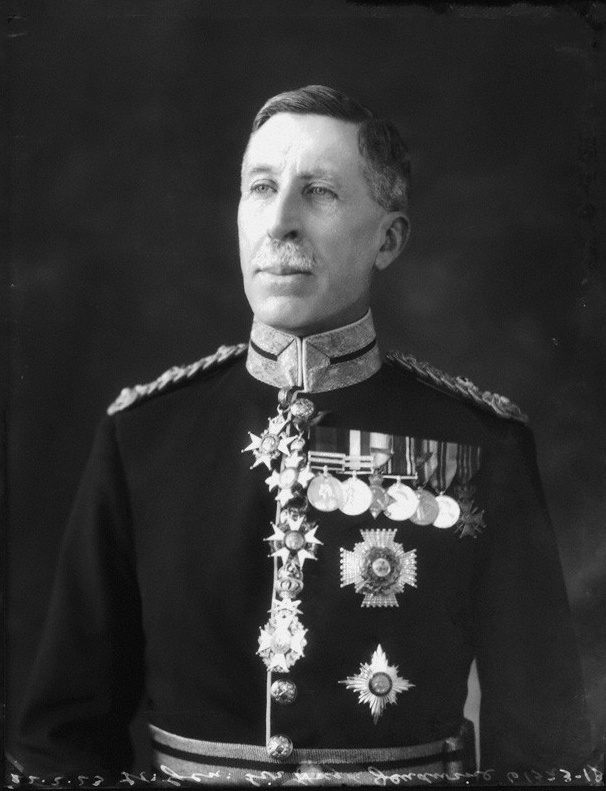
- Jeudwine in 1923
- Born: 9 June 1862; Chicheley, Buckinghamshire
- Died: 2 December 1942 (aged 80); Camberley, Surrey
- Military career
- Allegiance: United Kingdom
- Branch: British Army
- Service years: 1882–1927
- Rank: Lieutenant-General
- Commands: Territorial Army (1923–1927); 5th Division (1919–1922); 55th (West Lancashire) Division (1916–1919); 41st Brigade (1915–1916)
- Conflicts: Second Boer War; First World War
- Awards: Knight Commander of the Order of the Bath; Knight Commander of the Order of the British Empire; Mentioned in Despatches

Lieutenant-General Sir Hugh Sandham Jeudwine, KCB, KBE (9 June 1862 – 2 December 1942) was a British Army officer who served as Director General of the Territorial Army from 1923 to 1927.

== Early life and education ==
Jeudwine was born at Chicheley, Buckinghamshire, on 9 June 1862. He was the son of Reverend William Jeudwine, vicar of Chicheley, Newport Pagnell. He was educated at Eton College between 1876 and 1880 before attending the Royal Military Academy, Woolwich, from 1880 to 1882.

== Military career ==
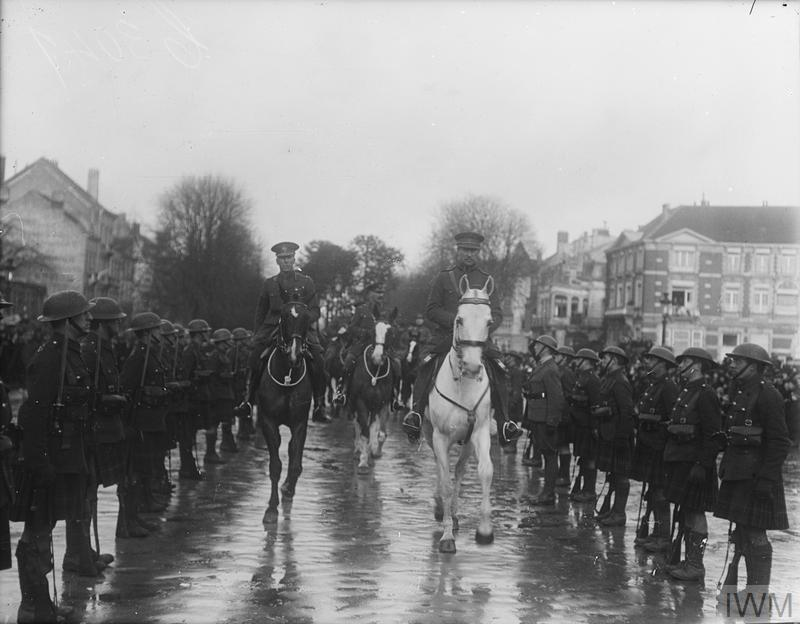
Albert I of Belgium and Major General Jeudwine arrive on horseback to review the 55th Division in the Bois de la Cambre, Brussels, January 1919.

After graduating from the Royal Military Academy, Woolwich, Jeudwine was commissioned as a lieutenant into the Royal Artillery as a lieutenant on 22 February 1882, and was promoted to captain on 31 December 1890. He served in the Second Boer War from 1899 to 1900, and was promoted to major on 4 January 1900. Following the end of the war in June 1902, he left Cape Town on the SS Canada and returned to Southampton in late July.

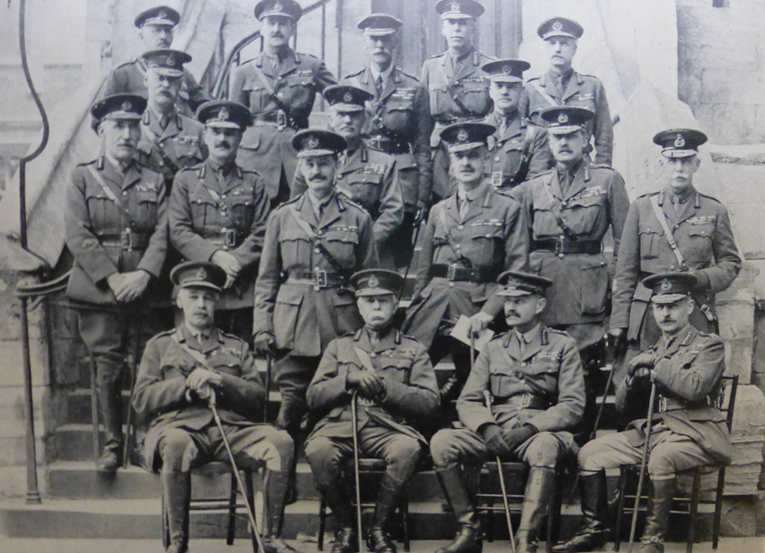
Eighteen Old Etonian generals revisit Eton, May 1919. Major General Jeudwine is stood in the back row, second from the left.

He was soon back in South Africa, however, as he was appointed a deputy assistant quartermaster general (DA&QMG) for Cape Colony in 1903. The following year he was appointed assistant superintendent of experiments at the School of Gunnery in 1904 and, promoted to lieutenant colonel in July 1908, deputy adjutant general at Aldershot Command in 1909, before taking a post on the staff at the Staff College, Camberley as a GSO2 in January 1912, in which role he succeeded Lieutenant Colonel William Furse.

He was promoted to colonel while serving in this position in March 1912. In January 1913 he succeeded Colonel John Gough as a general staff officer, grade 1 at the college.

Jeudwine served in the First World War, receiving promotion in January 1915 to the temporary rank of brigadier general upon being assigned as brigadier general, general staff (BGGS) of V Corps. He was awarded a Companion of the Companion of the Order of the Bath (CB) in February. In September, still a temporary brigadier general, he took over command of the 41st Infantry Brigade from Oliver Nugent. He then was general officer commanding (GOC) of the 55th (West Lancashire) Division from January 1916, which also saw him promoted to the temporary rank of major general, which in June became permanent (or substantive), a post he would hold for the rest of the war, making him one of the army's longest serving divisional commanders of the war. As a divisional commander he sought feedback from his officers (an unusual practice at the time) at the Battle of Passchendaele in 1917 and then played a crucial role in holding the German Sixth Army at Givenchy in April 1918. His CB was later upgraded to Knight Commander of the Order of the Bath in June 1918.

After the war Jeudwine became Chief of General Staff at Headquarters British Army on the Rhine and then, from 1919, General Officer Commanding 5th Division in Ireland. He was promoted to temporary lieutenant general in April 1921 which in January 1923 became substantive. His last appointment was as director general of the Territorial Army (TA) in October 1923 before he retired from the army in October 1927.

Military offices
Preceded by John Forster	GOC 55th (West Lancashire) Division; 1916–1919	Succeeded by Sir Reginald Barnes
Preceded by John Ponsonby	General Officer Commanding 5th Division; 1919–1922	Post disbanded (Post next held by Walter Kirke)
