= Bertram Best-Dunkley =

Recipient of the Victoria Cross

- Born: 3 August 1890; York, England
- Died: 5 August 1917 (aged 27); Pilckem Ridge, Passchendaele salient, Belgium
- Burial place: Mendinghem Military Cemetery, Proven
- Military career
- Allegiance: United Kingdom
- Branch: British Army
- Service years: –1917
- Rank: Lieutenant-Colonel
- Units: The Lancashire Fusiliers
- Conflicts: First World War: Western Front; Battle of Passchendaele; Battle of Pilckem Ridge (DOW)
- Awards: Victoria Cross

Lieutenant-Colonel Bertram Best-Dunkley VC (3 August 1890 – 5 August 1917) was an English recipient of the Victoria Cross, the highest and most prestigious award for gallantry in the face of the enemy that can be awarded to British and Commonwealth forces.

Best-Dunkley was 26 years old, and a temporary lieutenant-colonel in the 2/5th Battalion, The Lancashire Fusiliers (part of the 55th (West Lancashire) Division, British Army during the First World War on 31 July 1917 at Wieltje, Belgium, during the attack on Pilckem Ridge as part of the Battle of Passchendaele, when the following deed took place for which he was awarded the VC.

For most conspicuous bravery and devotion to duty when in command of his battalion, the leading waves of which, during an attack, became disorganised by reason of rifle and machine gun fire at close range from positions which were believed to be in our hands. Lt.-Col. Best-Dunkley dashed forward, rallied his leading waves, and personally led them to the assault of these positions, which, despite heavy losses, were carried. He continued to lead his battalion until all their objectives had been gained. Had it not been for this officer's gallant and determined action it is doubtful if the left of the brigade would have reached its objectives. Later in the day, when our position was threatened, he collected his battalion headquarters, led them to the attack, and beat off the advancing enemy. This gallant officer has since died of wounds.

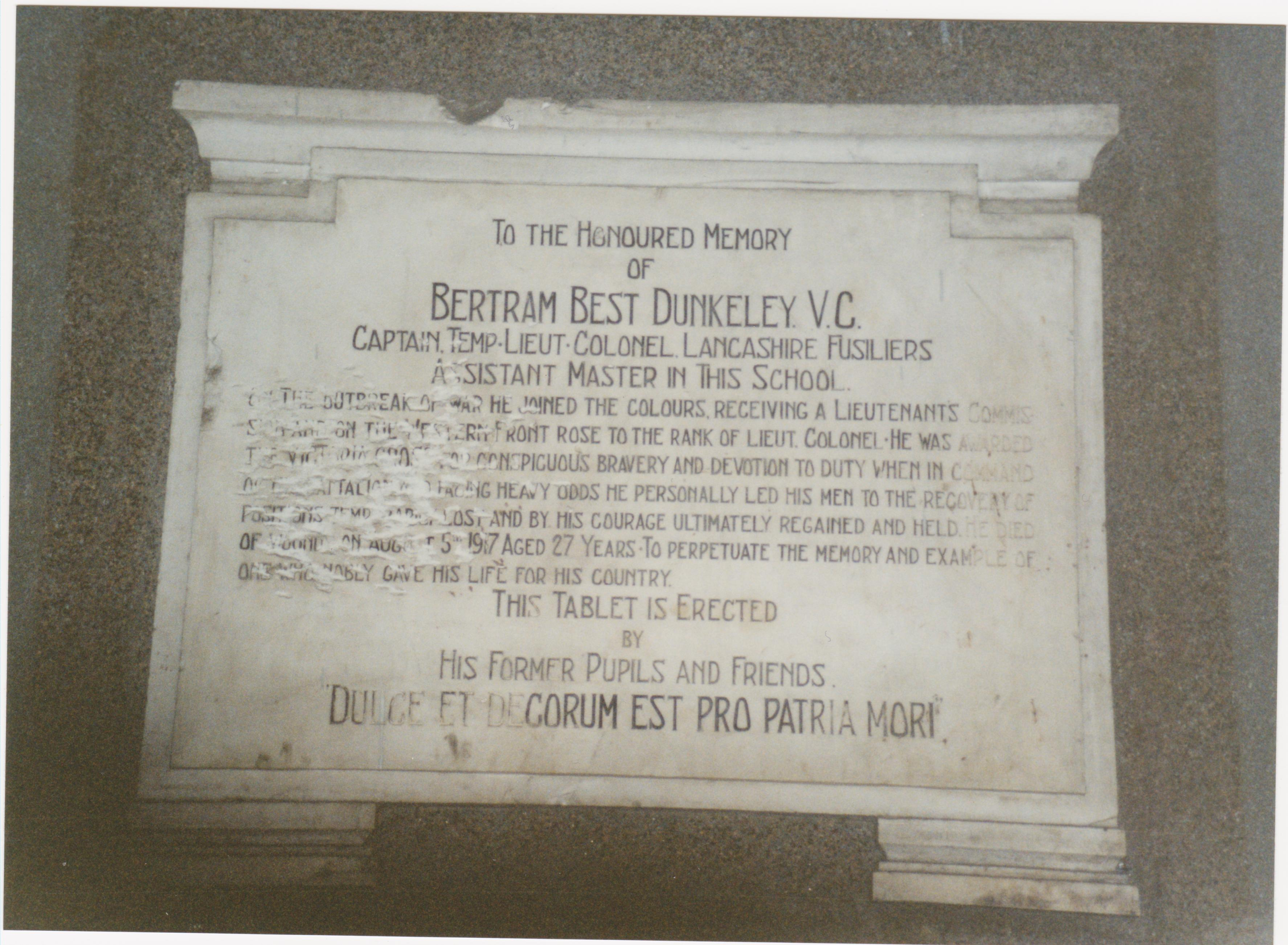
Memorial plaque at Tienstin Grammar School

Before enlisting, Best-Dunkley was a teacher at Tienstin Grammar School. There is a marble memorial plaque to him in the entrance hall of the School which was partially defaced by Japanese troops during their occupation of China.
