= Joseph Henry Collin =

Recipient of the Victoria Cross

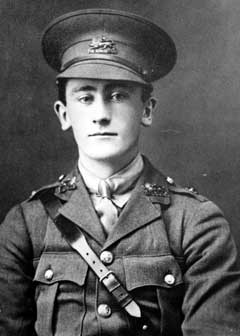
- Born: 10 April 1893; Jarrow, South Tyneside
- Died: 9 April 1918 (aged 24); Givenchy, France
- Burial place: Vieille-Chapelle New Military Cemetery, Lacouture
- Military career
- Allegiance: United Kingdom
- Branch: British Army
- Service years: 1915 – 1918
- Rank: Second Lieutenant
- Units: King's Own Royal Lancaster Regiment
- Conflicts: World War I †
- Awards: Victoria Cross

Joseph Henry Collin VC (Irish: Seosamh Annraoi Ó Coileáin; 10 April 1893 – 9 April 1918) was an English recipient of the Victoria Cross, the highest and most prestigious award for gallantry in the face of the enemy that can be awarded to British and Commonwealth forces.

Collin was born on 10 April 1893 to Joseph Collin and Mary MacDermont, of 8 Petteril Terrace, Harraby, Carlisle. He was 24 years old, and a second lieutenant in the 1/4th Battalion, King's Own Royal Lancaster Regiment when he was awarded the VC for his actions on 9 April 1918 at Givenchy, France. He was killed in action whilst performing the act.

== Citation ==
For most conspicuous bravery, devotion to duty and self-sacrifice in action. After offering a long and gallant resistance against heavy odds in the Keep held by his platoon, this officer, with only five of his men remaining, slowly withdrew in the face of superior numbers, contesting every inch of the ground. The enemy were pressing him hard with bombs and machine-gun fire from close range. Single-handed 2nd Lt. Collin attacked the machine gun and team. After firing his revolver into the enemy, he seized a Mills grenade and threw it into the hostile team, putting the gun out of action, killing four of the team and wounding two others. Observing a second hostile machine gun firing, he took a Lewis gun, and selecting a high point of vantage on the parapet whence he could engage the gun, he, unaided, kept the enemy at bay until he fell mortally wounded. The heroic self-sacrifice of 2nd Lt. Collin was a magnificent example to all.

— The London Gazette, 25 June 1918

His Victoria Cross is displayed at the King's Own Royal Regiment Museum, Lancaster, England.

== Bibliography ==
- Gliddon, Gerald (2013) [2004]. Spring Offensive 1918. VCs of the First World War. The History Press. ISBN 978-0-7524-8730-4.
- Whitworth, Alan (2015). VCs of the North: Cumbria, Durham & Northumberland. Pen and Sword Books. ISBN 978-1473848221.
