= James Hewitson =

English Victoria Cross recipient (1892-1963)

- Born: 15 October 1892; Coniston, Lancashire, England
- Died: 2 March 1963 (aged 70); Ulverston, Lancashire, England
- Burial place: Coniston Churchyard
- Military career
- Allegiance: United Kingdom
- Branch: British Army
- Service years: 1914 - 1918
- Rank: Corporal
- Units: King's Own (Royal Lancaster) Regiment
- Conflicts: World War I
- Awards: Victoria Cross

James Hewitson VC (15 October 1892 – 2 March 1963) was an English soldier awarded the Victoria Cross, the highest and most prestigious award for valor in the face of the enemy, bestowed upon British and Commonwealth forces.

== Details ==
Born in Coniston, Lancashire, 15 October 1892, he was a 25-year-old lance-corporal in the 1/4th Battalion, The King's Own (Royal Lancaster) Regiment, British Army during the First World War when the following deed took place, for which he was awarded the VC.

For most conspicuous bravery, initiative and daring in action.

In a daylight attack on a series of crater posts, L./Cpl. Hewitson led his party to their objective with dash and vigour, clearing the enemy from both trench and dug-outs, killing in one dug-out six of the enemy who would not surrender. After capturing the final objective, he observed a hostile machine-gun team coming into action against his men. Working his way round the edge of the crater he attacked the team, killing four and capturing one. Shortly afterwards he engaged a hostile bombing party, which was attacking a Lewis-gun post. He routed the party, killing six of them.

The extraordinary feats of daring performed by this gallant N.C.O. crushed the hostile opposition at this point.

He died 2 March 1963 in Ulverston and is buried at St Andrew's Churchyard, Coniston. His medal is privately held.

== Bibliography ==
- Gliddon, Gerald (2013) [2004]. Spring Offensive 1918. VCs of the First World War. Stroud, Gloucestershire: The History Press. ISBN 978-0-7524-8730-4.
- Whitworth, Alan (2015). VCs of the North: Cumbria, Durham & Northumberland. Pen and Sword Books. ISBN 978-1473848221.
