= 57th (2nd West Lancashire) Division =

2nd West Lancashire Division 57th (2nd West Lancashire) Division
- First World War division insignia
- Active: 5 November 1914–4 July 1919; 9 November 1943 – 29 July 1944
- Country: United Kingdom
- Branch: Territorial Force
- Role: Infantry Division (1914-1919); Deception formation (1943-1944)
- Engagements: Second Battle of Passchendaele; Second Battle of Arras; Battles for the Hindenburg Line

Commanders
- Notable commanders: Robert Broadwood; Reginald Barnes

The 57th (2nd West Lancashire) Division was an infantry formation of the Territorial Force created in 1914 as part of the massive expansion of the British Army during the First World War. It served on the Western Front during 1917 and 1918. The divisional number was reactivated for deception purposes during the Second World War.

== Origin ==
On 31 August 1914 the War Office authorised the formation of a reserve or 2nd-Line unit for each Territorial Force (TF) unit that was proceeding on overseas service. The 2nd West Lancashire Division came into existence in November 1914, composed of 2nd-Line duplicates of the battalions of the peacetime West Lancashire Division that were due to be sent overseas. The 1st-Line division was temporarily dispersed as its units went to France piecemeal, many of the divisional staff and support elements transferring to the new formation, which became 57th (2nd West Lancashire) Division in August 1915.

== History ==
The formations and units of 57th Division concentrated around Canterbury in early 1915 as part of Second Army, Central Force. Training was hampered by lack of equipment: the infantry trained on obsolete .256-inch Japanese rifles until .303-inch service rifles (many in poor condition) arrived in November 1915.

In November 1915 the War Office authorised the re-formation of 1st West Lancashire Division (now designated 55th (West Lancashire) Division), and a number of its original units returned from 57th Division, being replaced by their newly raised equivalents. The training of the 2nd-Line divisional artillery had been seriously delayed by lack of arms and equipment. One field artillery brigade had to borrow carbines from the Preston Church Lads Brigade. Only in mid-July 1915 did each field artillery brigade receive two 15-pounder BLC guns without sights. In September 1915 the 2nd-Line divisional artillery took over the obsolete 15-pounders and 5-inch howitzers when the 1st-Line artillery was re-equipped. The 2nd-Line received their modern 18-pounders and 4.5-inch howitzers in December 1915 and January 1916. Shortly afterwards the infantry battalions received their allotment of Lewis Guns.

In July 1916, 57th Division was transferred to the Emergency Reserves in the Aldershot area where it continued training.

On 5 January 1917 the division was ready for overseas service, and between 7 and 22 February its units and formations crossed to France and disembarked at Le Havre. On 25 February it took over a section of the Front Line under the command of II ANZAC Corps. 57th Division served on the Western Front for the rest of the war, taking part in the following operations:

- Second Battle of Passchendaele 26 October–7 November 1917 (under XIV Corps, then XIX Corps)
- Battle of the Lys 9–29 April 1918 (Divisional Artillery and 505 Company ASC only)
- Second Battle of Arras (under XVII Corps):
  - Battle of the Scarpe 28–30 August 1918
  - Battle of Drocourt-Queant Line 2–3 September 1918
- Battles of the Hindenburg Line (under XVII Corps):
  - Battle of the Canal du Nord 27 September–1 October 1918
  - Battle of Cambrai 8–9 October 1918
  - Capture of Cambrai 9 October 1918
- Final Advance in Artois and Flanders 15 October–1 November 1918 (under IX Corps):
  - Occupation of Lille 17 October 1918

On 1 November 1918 57 Division went into billets at Lille, and was still resting when the Armistice with Germany was signed. For the rest of 1918 its units were involved in clearing and evacuating stores from the Arras area. Demobilisation began in January 1919 and units were steadily reduced to cadres. The last cadres of 57th Division left France in July 1919, completing its disbandment.

== Order of battle ==
The following formations and units served in 57 Division during the First World War:

=== Divisional Troops ===
Mounted Troops

- 1st Lancashire Hussars – from 55 Division; left October–November 1915 to join 30, 31 and 35 Divisions
- 1st West Lancashire Divisional Cyclist Company – from 55 Division; left on 7 December 1915
- A Sqn 2/1st Bedfordshire Yeomanry – did not go to France
- 57th Divisional Cyclist Company – did not go to France
- 1/1st Kent Cyclist Battalion – joined at Canterbury November 1915; left for overseas service December 1915

Artillery

- 1st West Lancashire Divisional Artillery Royal Field Artillery (RFA) (four brigades) – joined April 1915; left for 2nd Canadian Division in France September 1915
- 1/1st Lancashire Heavy Battery Royal Garrison Artillery (RGA) – from 55 Division; joined April 1915; left for France December 1915
- 2/1st Lancashire Heavy Battery RGA – joined November 1915; left for France July 1916
- 57th Divisional Artillery:
  - CCLXXXV (2/I West Lancashire) Brigade RFA – joined September 1915
  - CCLXXXVI (2/II West Lancashire) Brigade RFA– joined September 1915
  - CCLXXXVII (2/III West Lancashire) Brigade RFA – joined September 1915; broken up on disembarkation and batteries distributed among remaining field brigades
  - 2/IV West Lancashire Howitzer Brigade RFA – joined September 1915; broken up July 1916 and batteries distributed among field brigades
  - 57th (2/1st West Lancashire) Divisional Ammunition Column RFA
- Divisional trench Mortar Batteries:
  - X, Y, Z Medium Trench Mortar Batteries – joined March 1917; Z absorbed by X and Y February 1918 '
  - W Heavy Trench Mortar Battery – joined March 1917; became XV Corps HTM Battery February 1918'

Engineers

- 2/1st West Lancashire Field Company Royal Engineers – left for 55 Division in France December 1915
- 2/2nd West Lancashire Field Company RE – left for 55 Division in France December 1915
- 1/3rd West Lancashire Field Company RE – joined November 1915; became 421 Field Company February 1917
- 1/3rd Wessex Field Company RE – joined December 1915; became 502 Field Company February 1917
- 2/3rd Wessex Field Company RE – joined February 1916; became 505 Field Company February 1917
- 1st West Lancashire Signal Company RE – from 55 Division; left December 1915
- 57th (2/1st West Lancashire) Signal Company RE – formed September 1915

Pioneers

- 5th Battalion, Loyal North Lancashire Regiment – from 170 Bde February 1918

Machine Gun Units

- 173rd Machine Gun Company – joined March 1917
- No 57 Battalion Machine Gun Corps – formed March 1918 from 173 Coy and Brigade MG Coys

Medical Units

- 2/1st West Lancashire Field Ambulance Royal Army Medical Corps – left for 55 Division in France December 1915
- 1/2nd West Lancashire Field Ambulance RAMC – left for 30 Division in France October 1915
- 1/3rd West Lancashire Field Ambulance RAMC – left for 55 Division in France December 1915
- 2/2nd Wessex Field Ambulance RAMC – joined December 1915
- 2/3rd Wessex Field Ambulance RAMC – joined December 1915
- 3/2nd West Lancashire Field Ambulance RAMC – joined December 1915
- 57th (West Lancashire) Sanitary Section – transferred to Second Army April 1917

Transport Units

- 57th (1/1st West Lancashire) Divisional Train Army Service Corps – from 55 Division
  - 505th, 506th, 507th, 508th Horse Transport Companies

Other Units

- 57th Mobile Veterinary Section Army Veterinary Corps
- 248th Divisional Employment Company – formed June 1917

=== Attached Troops ===
- IX Corps Mounted Troops – attached October–November 1918:
  - 1st King Edward's Horse
  - 11th Cyclist Battalion Army Cyclist Corps
- Portuguese Expeditionary Corps (part) – attached October–November 1918:
  - IV Portuguese Field Battery
  - 1st Portuguese Field Company
  - 14th Portuguese Battalion
  - 15th Portuguese Battalion
  - 5th Portuguese Field Ambulance

== Commanders ==
The following officers commanded 57 Division during the First World War:

- Brig. Gen. F. A. Adam – acting from 5 November 1914
- Maj.-Gen. J. B. Forster – from April 1915
- Lieut.-Gen. R.G. Broadwood – from 20 October 1916; died of wounds 21 June 1917
- Brig. Gen. J. C. Wray – acting
- Maj.-Gen. Reginald W. R. Barnes – from 1 July 1917

== Second World War ==
The 57th Division was never reformed, but the number was used for deception purposes during the war. The 42nd Brigade headquarters was formed in the UK on 26 July 1943 and sent to North Africa to command internal security units on the Lines of Communication under Allied Force Headquarters. These units had a full complement of personnel, but 80 per cent of them were below Medical Category 'A' and they were armed only with personal weapons and a skeleton allotment of transport.

The 42nd Brigade HQ landed on 25 August 1943, and was redesignated '57th Division' on 9 November to deceive the enemy. To aid the deception, the commanding officer, Brigadier P.H. Cadoux-Hudson, was given the appropriate local rank of Major-General, and three of the battalions were redesignated as brigades.

=== Order of Battle of '57th Division' ===
- 30th Battalion, Royal Northumberland Fusiliers – '170th Brigade' up to 30 April 1944
- 31st Battalion, Suffolk Regiment – '171st Brigade' up to 19 June 1944
- 30th Battalion, Green Howards – '172nd Brigade' up to 26 December 1943
- 30th Battalion, Bedfordshire and Hertfordshire Regiment – '172nd Brigade' from 26 December 1943 to 27 July 1944

The 'division' reused the First World War formation sign. The 42nd Brigade HQ was disbanded in North Africa on 29 July 1944, and '57th Division' ceased to exist on the same date.

== See also ==
- List of British divisions in World War I
- List of British divisions in World War II
