= 123rd Siege Battery, Royal Garrison Artillery =

123rd Siege Battery, RGA
- Cap Badge of the Royal Regiment of Artillery
- Active: March 1916–1919
- Country: United Kingdom
- Branch: British Army
- Role: Siege artillery
- Part of: Royal Garrison Artillery
- Garrison/HQ: Portland
- Engagements: Arras; Ypres; Cambrai; German spring offensive Hundred Days Offensive

123rd Siege Battery was a unit of Britain's Royal Garrison Artillery (RGA) formed in 1916 during World War I. It served on the Western Front, including the Battles of Arras, Passchendaele, Cambrai and the crushing victories of the Allied Hundred Days Offensive in 1918. Post war, the battery was disbanded in 1919.

== Mobilisation ==
123rd Siege Battery was formed at Portland under Army Council Instruction 701 of 31 March 1916, based upon a cadre of 3 officers and 78 other ranks drawn from the Dorsetshire Royal Garrison Artillery of the Territorial Force. It went out to the Western Front on 18 July 1916, manning four 6-inch 26 cwt howitzers, and joined 47th Heavy Artillery Group (HAG) in Third Army on 23 July.

== Service ==
Third Army was not engaged in any major operations during the second half of 1916, so this was a relatively quiet sector of the front. It was the policy to switch siege batteries from one HAG to another as the situation demanded, and the battery came under the command of 8th HAG on 12 September, to 46th HAG on 17 September, back to 8th on 1 October, back to 46th on 17 October, to 8th again on 20 October, then to 35th HAG on 1 December. The pattern continued in 1917: a return to 47th HAG on 11 January, then to 81st HAG on 18 February and 10th HAG on 24 March.

=== Arras ===
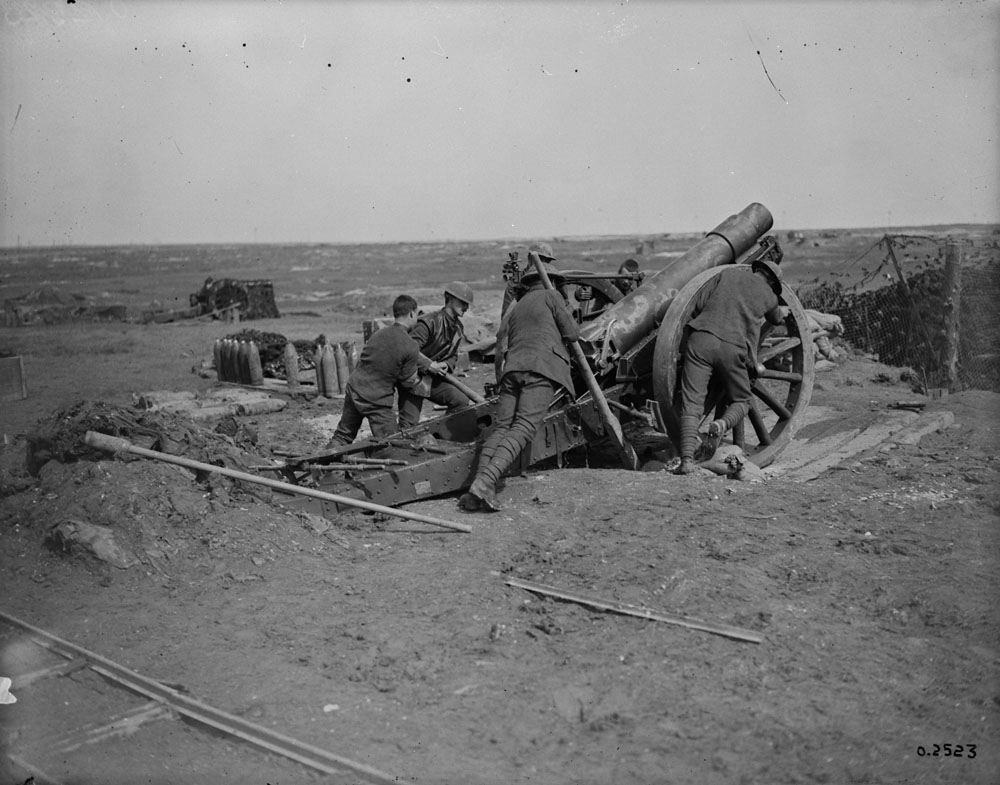
Crew positioning a 6-inch 26 cwt howitzer.

10th Heavy Artillery Group had just joined Third Army as it prepared for the Battle of Arras and was assigned to VI Corps. The artillery part of this attack was a carefully planned barrage in great depth. After the preliminary bombardment, the howitzers laid a standing barrage on the German trenches at Zero hour. Then as the attacking infantry reached the first objective behind a creeping barrage fired by the field guns, the howitzers lifted to the Phase 2 objectives, the German fourth line trenches, known as the 'Blue Line'. Once the infantry reached this line, the field guns began moving forward into No man's land and the 6-inch howitzers moved up to take over the vacated field gun positions, to help shoot the infantry on to the Brown Line or final objective. The attack went in at 05.30 on 9 April 1917, and VI Corps had a successful day, seizing 'Observation Ridge', which denied it to German Observation Posts (OPs) and gave British OPs excellent views to bring down heavy gunfire onto German artillery packed into 'Battery Valley' beyond.

Fighting continued in the Arras sector for VI Corps until the middle of May. 123rd Siege Bty came under 65th HAG from 12 April, and then went to 72nd HAG on 16 May.

=== Ypres ===
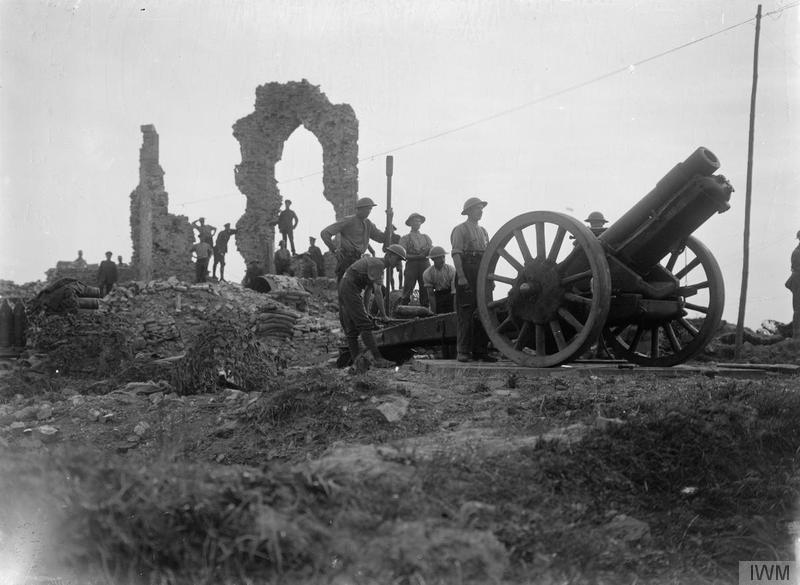
6-inch howitzer and crew during the Ypres offensive, 1917.

On 2 July 1917 123rd Siege Bty moved to 57th HAG and then on to 10th HAG on 9 July; both these heavy groups were assigned to Fifth Army, whose heavy guns were engaged in a long artillery duel with the Germans throughout July in preparation for the Third Ypres Offensive. Slowly the British got the upper hand, and a large proportion of German guns were out of action when the infantry attacked on 31 July (the Battle of Pilckem). While the field guns and light howitzers fired their creeping and standing barrages, the 6-inch howitzers fired 'back barrages' behind the German second line to break up counter-attacks and destroy machine guns firing at long range. The attack was a partial success, but Fifth Army's guns were also suffering badly from German counter-battery (CB) fire, and the offensive bogged down. A second push on 16 August (the Battle of Langemarck) suffered from rushed artillery planning and was unsuccessful.

123rd Siege Bty was with II Corps on 26 August when it was joined by a section from the newly-arrived 414th Siege Bty, (Note: 414th Siege Battery, RGA, had been formed on 10 April 1917 at Prees Heath Army Camp; the other section went to reinforce 162nd Siege Bty.) in preparation for bringing the battery up to a strength of six 6-inch howitzers; however it does not appear that the additional guns arrived until 19 February 1918. The offensive continued through the summer and autumn of 1917: gun batteries were packed into the Ypres Salient – II Corps had 36 RGA batteries in the Dickebusch area – where they were under observation and CB fire from the Germans on the higher ground. Casualties among guns and gunners were high, and II Corps failed to make much progress.

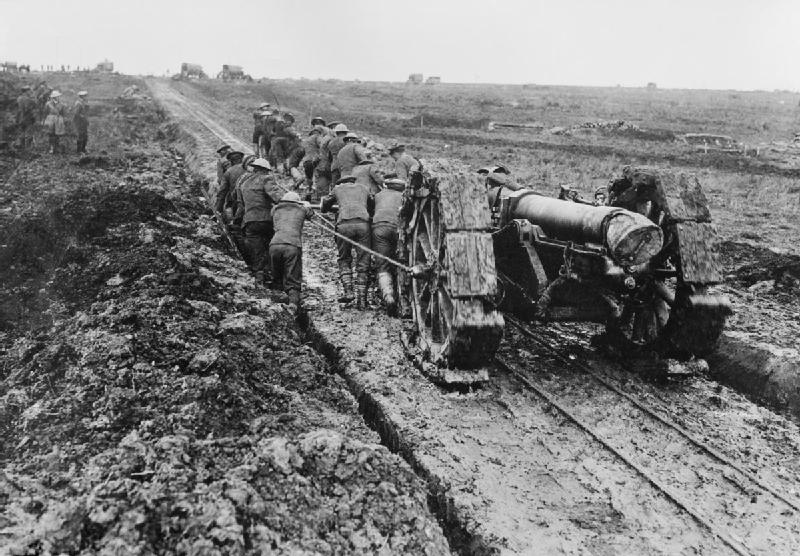
6-inch howitzer being moved through mud on the Western Front.

Second Army HQ took over the faltering offensive in September, and 10th HAG came under its control. The Battles of the Menin Road, Polygon Wood and Broodseinde were highly successful because of the weight of artillery brought to bear on German positions. But as the offensive continued with the Battle of Poelcappelle and First and Second Battles of Passchendaele, the tables were turned: British batteries were clearly observable from the Passchendaele Ridge and were subjected to CB fire, while their own guns sank into the mud and became difficult to aim and fire. 123rd Siege Bty was transferred to 7th HAG within Second Army on 5 October, and then to 71st HAG with Fifth Army on 29 October

On 13 November the battery transferred to 88th HAG with XVII Corps. By now HAG allocations were becoming more fixed, and in December the 88th was converted into a permanent RGA brigade. 123rd Siege Bty stayed with 88th Bde until the Armistice a year later.

=== Cambrai ===
In November 88th HAG was assigned to Third Army, which was preparing for its surprise attack with tanks at the Battle of Cambrai. There was to be no preliminary bombardment or registration, and the guns were to open fire at Zero hour firing 'off the map' at carefully surveyed targets. When the battle began with a crash of artillery at 06.20 on 20 November the German defenders were stunned, and the massed tanks completed their overcome. In most areas the attack was an outstanding success. Exploitation over succeeding days was less spectacular, though some bombardments were set up to help the infantry take certain villages.

=== Spring Offensive ===
When the German spring offensive opened on 21 March 1918, 88th Bde RGA was with XVII Corps. Although the attacks primarily hit Fifth Army, part of Third Army's front was also attacked, VI Corps coming under especially heavy pressure. At 16.30 that afternoon, 88th Bde RGA was ordered to move from XVII Corps to assist VI Corps. Over the next two weeks, VI Corps and Third Army fought a series of rearguard actions through the 'Great Retreat', at Bapaume, Arras and the Ancre.

=== Hundred Days Offensive ===
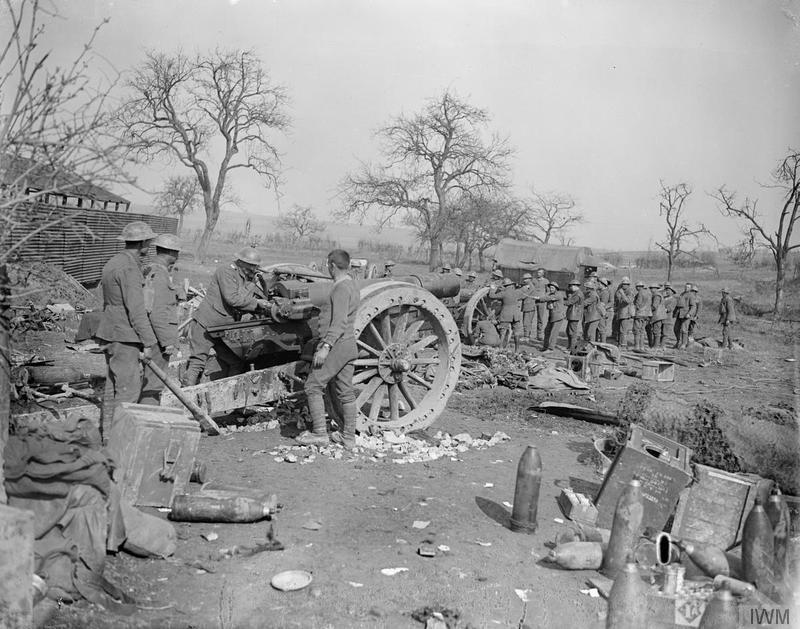
Crew cleaning the breech of a 6-inch howitzer, 1918.

88th Brigade was still with VI Corps when Third Army joined in the Allied Hundred Days Offensive at the Battle of Albert on 23 August. It was assigned to support 156th (Scottish Rifles) Brigade of 52nd (Lowland) Division, which passed through after the attack started in order to form a firm flank. Although the planning of the operation was rushed, the artillery barrage was very good and the infantry were on their objective by 06.00, less than an hour after Zero.

Two days later, XVII Corps took over that part of the front, including 52nd (L) Division and 88th Bde RGA, ready for the Battle of the Scarpe on 28 August. This time the brigade supported 172nd (2/1st South Lancashire) Brigade of 57th (2nd West Lancashire) Division, shelling the objective while the infantry advanced behind a field artillery barrage. The objective was taken after considerable opposition. XVII Corps' next attack was the Battle of Drocourt-Quéant Line on 2 September. The RGA brigades fired CB tasks until 06.00, when they switched to concentrate on the triangle of ground between the Hindenburg Line and the Drocourt-Quéant Switch Line. 172nd Brigade captured both branches of the D-Q line, then 156th Bde passed through and took 1,300 yards (1,200 m) of the Main Hindenburg position; by the evening they were on to the Hindenburg Support Line.

88th Brigade and its batteries moved to V Corps on 15 September in time for the Battle of Épehy, but was back with VI Corps on 23 September to prepare for the Battle of the Canal du Nord on 28 September. (Note: The Official History lists 88th Brigade among those supporting II Corps in Second Army for the Fifth Battle of Ypres starting on 28 September. However, this appears to be an error: 88th Bde's war diary confirms that it remained with Third Army throughout this period.) VI Corps next took part in the Second Battle of Cambrai on 8 October. The assault was carried out by 2nd and 3rd Divisions; as well as CB fire, the heavy guns contributed a 30-minute incendiary bombardment on the village of Séranvillers.

Third Army needed to gain a substantial bridgehead over the River Selle to prepare for the next major push, so it attacked on 20 October (the Battle of the Selle). The operation began with a surprise attack, without any preliminary bombardment, with Zero hour at 02.00 under a full moon. 123rd Siege Bty was with 88th Bde, one of six heavy brigades supporting VI Corps' assault crossing, attack on the village of Solesmes and then advance to the ridge behind. The heavy guns had to avoid firing on Solesmes itself, which was full of French civilians. The attacking divisions were on their objectives by the end of the morning.

On 1 November, 88th Bde was standing by to transfer to XVII Corps for the forthcoming operations, but the enemy were now retiring so rapidly that it was difficult to get heavy guns forward into range. The brigade's batteries hardly fired another shot before the Armistice with Germany came into force on 11 November.

123rd Siege Battery was disbanded in 1919.

== External sources ==
- The Long, Long Trail
