= Mill Street Barracks =

- St Helens
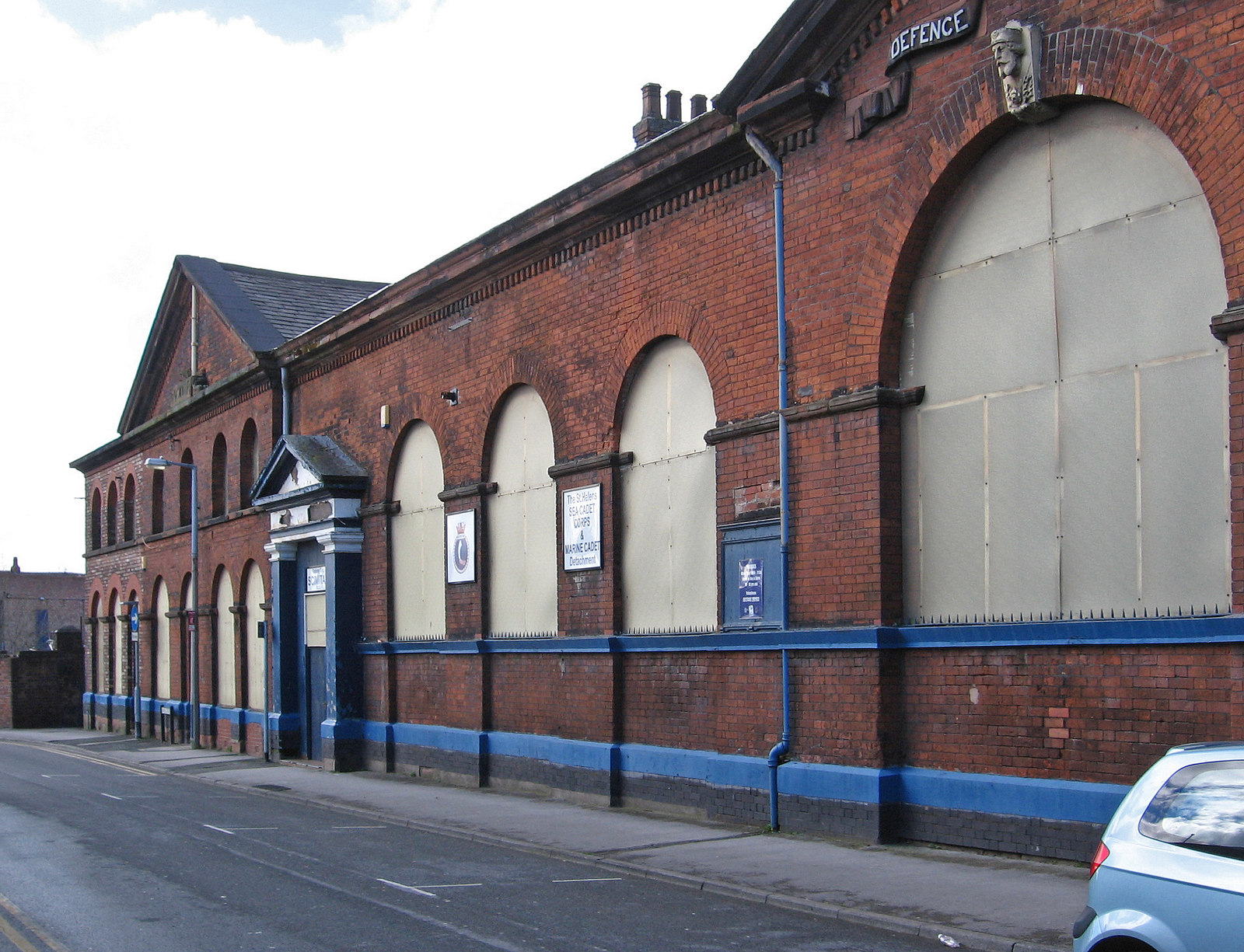
- Mill Street Barracks

Site information
- Type: Drill hall

Location
- Location within Merseyside
- Coordinates: 53.45634°N 2.74083°W

Site history
- Built: 1861
- Built for: War Office
- In use: 1861-1980

Mill Street Barracks is a former military installation in St Helens, Merseyside that is currently used by the Sea Cadets.

== History ==
The building was designed as the headquarters of the 47th Lancashire Rifle Volunteer Corps and completed in 1861. This unit evolved to become the 21st Lancashire Rifle Volunteer Corps in 1880, the 2nd Volunteer Battalion, The Prince of Wales's Volunteers (South Lancashire Regiment) in 1886 and the 5th Battalion, South Lancashire Regiment in 1908. The battalion was mobilised at the barracks in August 1914 before being deployed to the Western Front and was still based there at the start of the Second World War.

The battalion converted to form the 61st (5th Battalion, The South Lancashire Regiment) Searchlight Regiment, Royal Artillery in 1940. This unit evolved to become the 612th Regiment, Royal Artillery (The South Lancashire Regiment) in 1945, the 596th Light Anti-Aircraft Regiment, Royal Artillery (The South Lancashire Regiment) in 1947 and the 436th (South Lancashire Artillery) Light Anti-Aircraft Regiment, Royal Artillery in 1955. The presence at the barracks was reduced to a single battery, 213 (South Lancashire Artillery) Battery, 103rd (Lancashire Artillery Volunteers) Light Air Defence Regiment, Royal Artillery in 1969. After the battery moved to more modern facilities at Jubilee Barracks, the Mill Street Barracks were decommissioned and converted for use by the Sea Cadets as the Training Ship Scimitar.
