= 5th Battalion, South Lancashire Regiment =

5th Battalion, South Lancashire Regiment (PWV) 61st Searchlight Regiment, RA
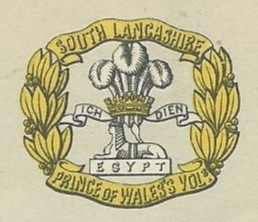
- Active: 29 February 1860–1992
- Country: United Kingdom
- Branch: Territorial Army
- Type: Infantry Battalion; Searchlight Regiment; Air Defence Regiment
- Part of: South Lancashire Regiment
- Garrison/HQ: Mill Street Barracks, St Helens, Merseyside
- Engagements: 2nd Boer War; 2nd Battle of Ypres; Battle of Guillemont; Battle of Pilckem Ridge; Battle of the Menin Road Ridge; Battle of Cambrai; Defence of Givenchy; The Blitz; Operation Diver

The 5th Battalion, South Lancashire Regiment, was a unit of the British Army's Reserve Forces first established in St Helens, Lancashire, in 1860. It served as infantry in some of the bitterest fighting on the Western Front in World War I and as a searchlight regiment in Anti-Aircraft Command during World War II.

== Origin ==
The unit had its origins in two of the many Rifle Volunteer Corps (RVCs) formed in the wake of an invasion scare in 1859. The 47th Lancashire RVC formed at St Helens on 29 February 1860, consisting of five companies. It was under the command of Major David Gamble, a local chemical manufacturer, and members of the Pilkington glassmaking family of St Helens and Brunner chemical manufacturing family of Widnes were prominent among the unit's officers. Its drill hall, built in 1861 and known as Mill Street Barracks, was at the corner of Volunteer street and Mill Street, St Helens. The 48th Lancashire RVC was a single company unit formed at Prescot under Captain Walter Wren Driffield on 15 March 1860. The two units were combined on 19 October 1880 under the Childers Reforms as the 21st Lancashire RVC (the original 21st (Wigan) Lancashire RVC having merged into another unit). The new unit had an establishment of eight companies and a uniform of Rifle green with scarlet facings.

On 1 July 1881 it became a Volunteer Battalion (VB) of the Prince of Wales's Volunteers (South Lancashire Regiment) and on 1 July 1886 it was designated the 2nd VB. Under the mobilisation scheme introduced by the Stanhope Memorandum of 1888, it formed part of the Mersey Volunteer Infantry Brigade, later the Cheshire and Lancashire Brigade, and then the Lancashire Brigade from 1900.

== South Africa ==
In January 1900, the 2nd VB, commanded by Col W.W. Pilkington, offered to send volunteers to reinforce the 1st Battalion South Lancashires fighting in the 2nd Boer War. Between them the two Volunteer battalions raised a service company which, after a short period training at Orford Barracks, Warrington, was sent out and joined the Regulars at Ladysmith on 29 March 1900. It took part in all the 1st Bn's operations up to the occupation of Vryheid, and then went back to Ladysmith for garrison duties until it returned to England in May 1901. It was followed by three further contingents to serve with the 1st Bn, as well as numerous individuals from the Volunteer battalion serving with the Imperial Yeomanry, the Mounted Infantry, the South African Constabulary and various non-combatant corps.

The battalion was subsequently awarded its first Battle honour: 'South Africa 1900–01'.

== Territorial Force ==
On the formation of the Territorial Force (TF) under the Haldane Reforms in 1908, the 2nd VB became the 5th Battalion of the South Lancashires, forming part of the South Lancashire Brigade in the West Lancashire Division of the TF.

== World War I ==
=== Mobilisation ===
The West Lancashire Division had just begun its annual training when war broke out on 4 August 1914. The units immediately returned to their drill halls to mobilise for war, and the bulk of them volunteered for overseas service. The 5th Bn went to its war station at Edinburgh, moving in October to Tunbridge Wells.

On 31 August 1914, the formation of Reserve or 2nd-Line units for each existing TF unit was authorised. Initially these were formed from men who had not volunteered for overseas service, and the recruits who were flooding in. These were designated by a '2/' prefix to distinguish them from their 1st-Line parent unit (prefixed '1/'). Later they were mobilised for overseas service in their own right and 3rd-Line battalions were created to train reserves.

=== 1/5th Battalion ===
During the winter of 1914-15 the battalions of the West Lancashire Division began to be sent to reinforce the Regulars of the British Expeditionary Force (BEF) fighting in France. The 1/5th Battalion South Lancashires, under the command of Lieutenant-Colonel L.E. Pilkington, disembarked at Le Havre on 13 February 1915 and joined 12th Brigade in 4th Division for instruction in Trench warfare.

The sector occupied by 12th Bde was one of the worst on the BEF's front, with the water table so high that trenches could not be used and defences consisted of breastworks. The battalion was also employed in mining, and won four Distinguished Conduct Medals (DCMs) for gallantry during these operations.

==== 2nd Ypres ====
The 4th Division was engaged in the 2nd Battle of Ypres from 28 April to 25 May 1915, including the Battles of St Julien, Frezenberg Ridge and Bellewaarde Ridge. The 1/5th Bn marched up on 28 April as 12th Bde took up positions at Turco Farm alongside French troops. At midday on 2 May the Germans began a heavy bombardment of 4th Division's front, and then at 16.00 released a heavy concentration of chlorine gas and attacked. 1/5th Battalion was in reserve, and sent up 'A' Company, commanded by Captain Guy Pilkington, to help. Charging through the gas cloud, 'A' Company reached the front line trenches in time to help repel the attack. The British line south of St Julien had given way, so the following day the 1/5th Bn, less 'A' Company, took up new positions around Shell Trap Farm while the Germans consolidated. About 17.00 on 5 May the battalion's positions received a violent bombardment, which caused many casualties and collapsed most of the parapets. Company Sergeant-Major F. Smith won a DCM for rescuing seven men who had been buried. This fire continued until midnight, during which the battalion repulsed four small attacks. During the night the battalion was reinforced by 'A' Company, and was relieved the following night.

Over the next few days the battalion frequently moved up to reinforce or support the line as German attacks continued, until it was relieved on 16 May. The 1/5h Bn was back in the line on 22 May, and two days later the Germans released the heaviest concentration of gas yet encountered, followed by an infantry attack. The situation quickly became critical, and the battalion sent up 'B' and 'C' Companies under Major W.N. Pilkington to hold the line near Shell Trap Farm to connect with the French while the rest moved into 4th Division's support line. The two companies suffered heavy casualties under shell fire, and at one time there as a gap of 1500 yards between them and the French flank. Contact with the French was restored with great difficulty, and during the night 4th Division fell back to the support line, and the South Lancashires had to improve the positions while keeping the enemy at bay with snipers and bombing parties. Fighting died down on 25 May, ending the battle. Lieutenant-Colonel L.E. Pilkington was later awarded a CMG, and Major W.N. Pilkington a DSO for their work in the Ypres Salient.

In August 1915 the 4th Division left the Salient and took over a new sector of the line north of Albert, Somme. On 4 November 1915 the experienced 12th Brigade was transferred to help train the newly arrived 36th (Ulster) Division.

At the beginning of 1916 the West Lancashire Division, redesignated 55th (West Lancashire) Division, was reconstituted in France, and 1/5th South Lancashires rejoined it on 6 January, taking its place in 166th (South Lancashire) Brigade and holding a quiet sector south of Arras.

==== Somme ====
The 55th Division entered the Somme sector in August 1916, occupying part of the line around Fricourt, and later took part in the following battles of the Somme offensive: Guillemont, Ginchy, Flers-Courcelette and Morval.

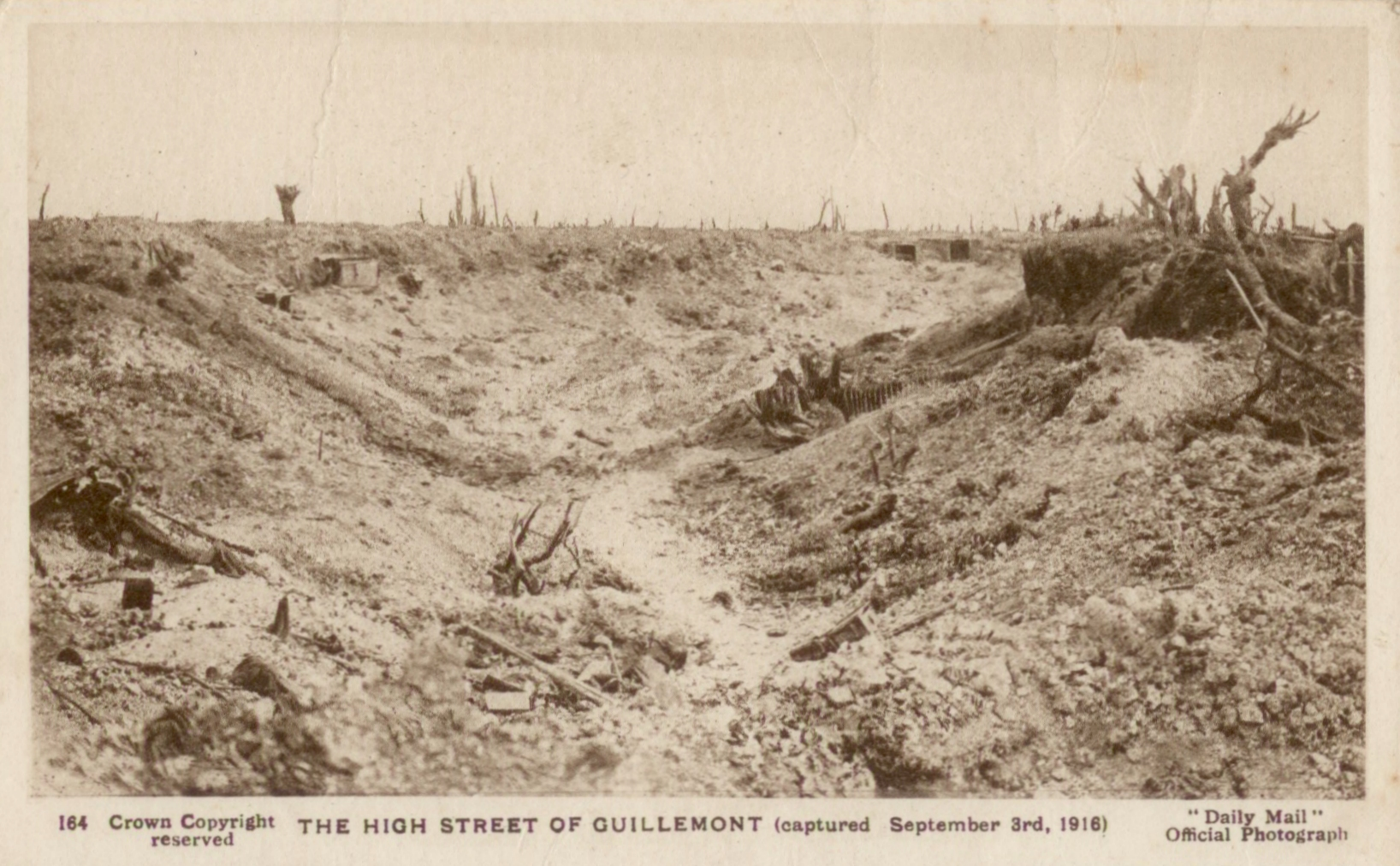
The High Street of Guillemont in September 1916.

The 166th Bde was in reserve for the start of 55th Division's attack on Guillemont, but continued the attack on 9 August, with 1/5th Bn in support. 166th Bde's attackers became entangled with the troops who had made the previous attack, and 1/5th Bn's supporting companies became hopelessly mixed up with them under shellfire. Later that day it was pushed forward to consolidate a new position in front of Trônes Wood. On 13 August, 'D' company took part in a minor operation against an isolated trench, but the adjacent French attack failed, and the operation was unsuccessful. When the battalion was relieved on 15 August, it had suffered over 80 casualties for no advantage.

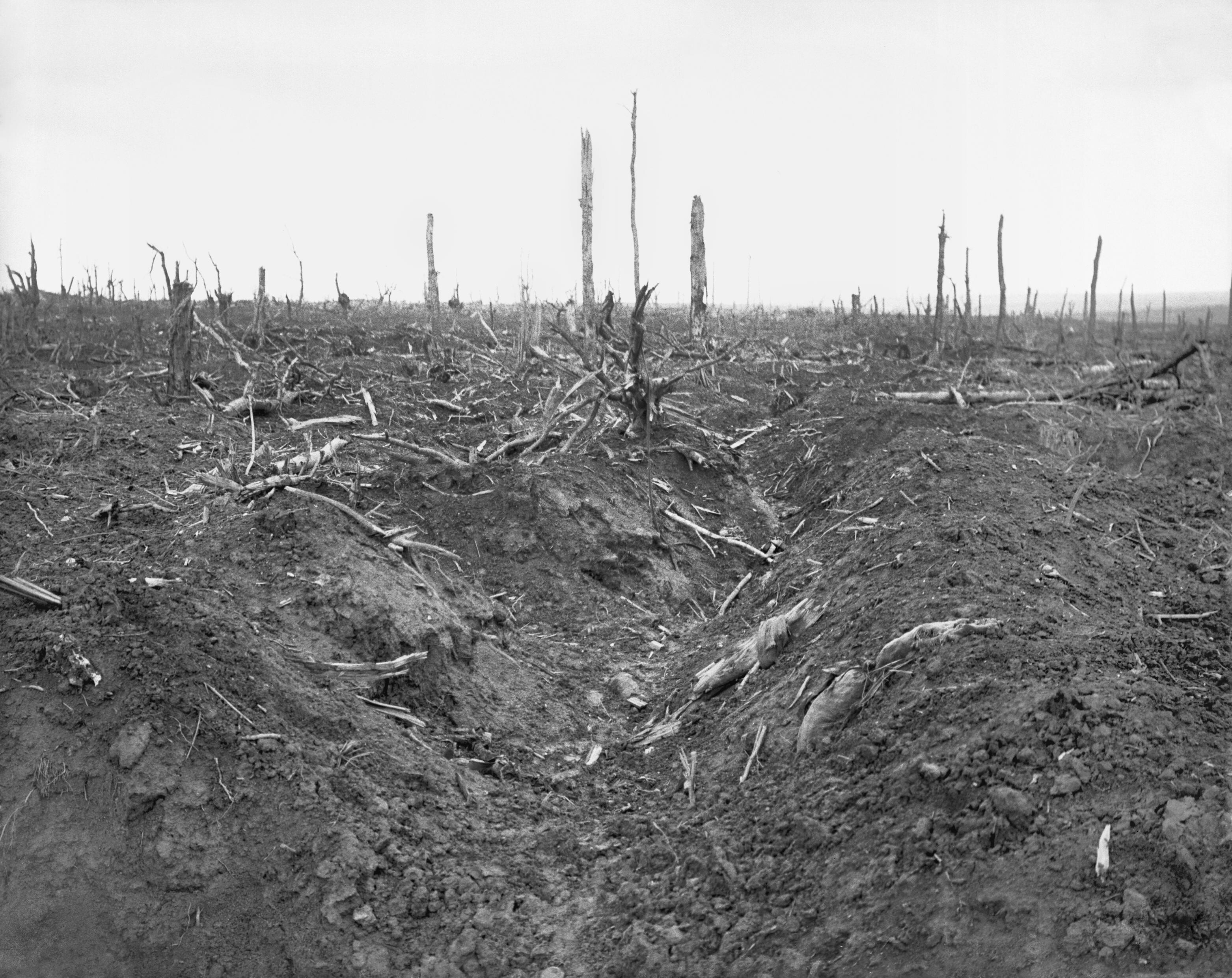
Delville Wood in September 1916.

55th Division returned to the line in front of Delville Wood on 4 September, where 1/5th Bn was kept busy digging communication trenches and strongpoints. On 8 September an attack by a neighbouring brigade elicited a violent counter-attack that almost broke through the battalion's barricade near Delville Wood. It spent the night building new strongpoints in front of its line, and when it withdrew it had suffered another 160 casualties. When it went back into the line it occupied trenches that had already been taken in the Battle of Flers-Courcelette, nor was 1/5th Bn involved in 55th Division's actions in the Battle of Morval. The division let the Somme sector at the end of September.

==== 3rd Ypres ====
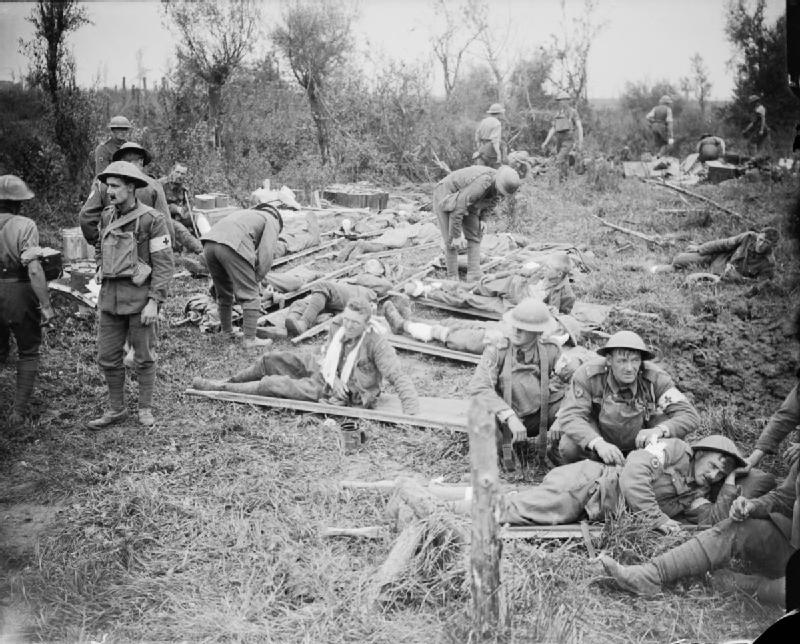
British wounded at the Battle of Pilckem Ridge

The 55th Division took part in the Battle of Pilckem Ridge, the opening phase of the 3rd Battle of Ypres, on 31 July 1917. The 1/5th Bn had been withdrawn from the line for training during June, and moved up to its assembly position on 30 July. Its role in the attack was to support the attack by the leading battalions, passing through to take the second objective on the 'Black Line'. The leading wave went over the top at 03.50, and the 1/5th advanced at 05.05. As it advanced towards the Black Line the firing became heavier and the platoons advanced by short rushes until they got to within 200 yards of the objective. Here they were checked until two tanks came up and allowed the battalion to resume its advance and clear the enemy dug-outs. Despite harassing fire and bombardment the battalion consolidated its position in Capricorn Trench, which was the most advanced reached by the British on that depressing day. Although 55th Division's casualties were unusually high, 1/5th Bn suffered moderately, with 28 killed, 138 wounded and 12 missing. After holding Capricorn Trench through torrents of rain and consequent mud, it was taken out of the line on 4 August.

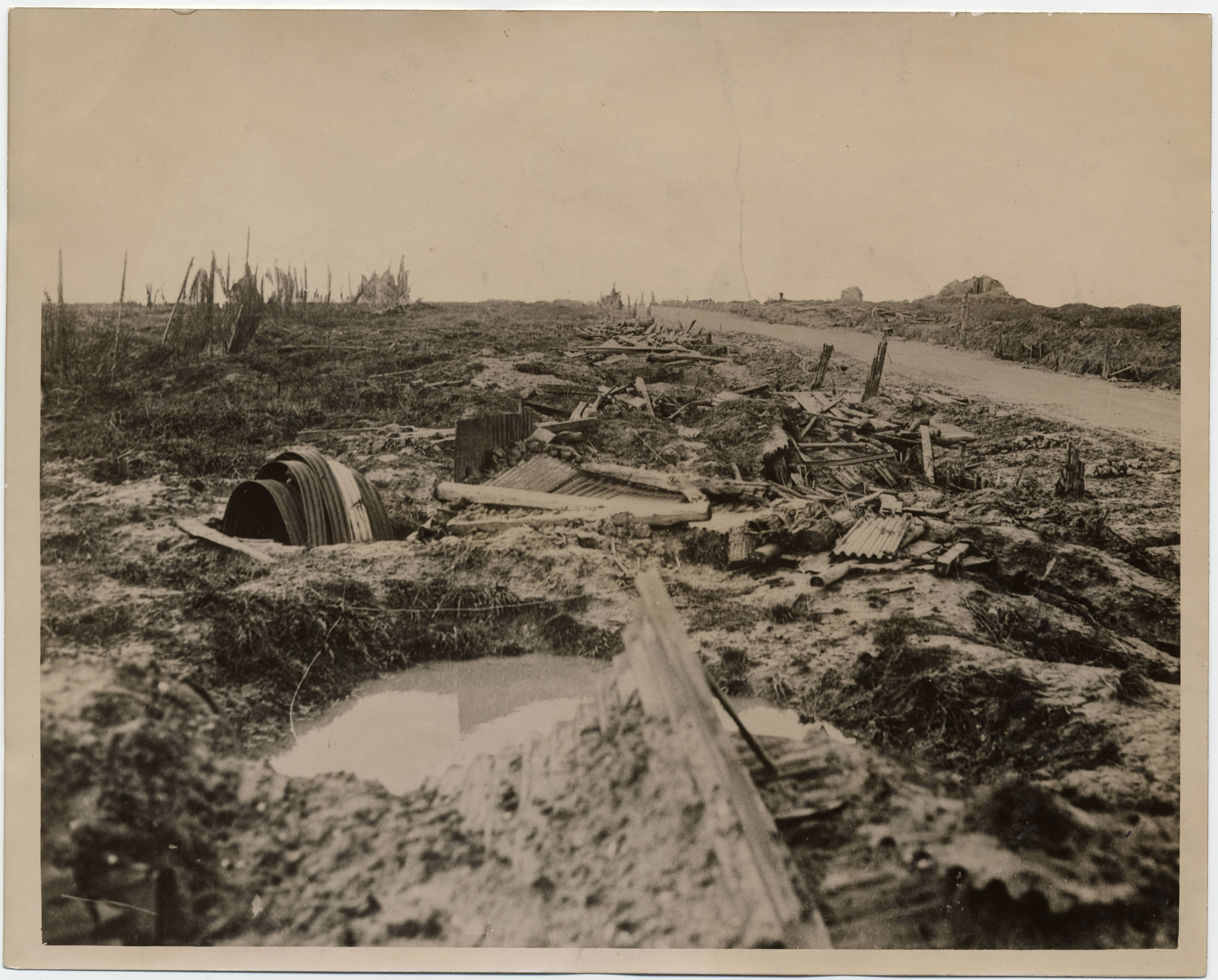
The Menin Road.

The battalion returned to the same sector in September and was in reserve when 55th Division attacked Gravenstafel Ridge in the Battle of the Menin Road Ridge in 20 September. About mid-day, the 1/5th was ordered to send up 'B' and 'C' Companies to continue the attack on Hill 37, which was holding out. The two companies advanced by rushes and took the position. Not knowing of this success, the rest of the battalion was ordered up to take Hill 37 and Gallipoli Copse. Finding Hill 37 already in their hands, the rest of the 1/5th carried on the capture Gallipoli Copse and consolidate before the expected German counter-attack. Assisted by heavy artillery fire, this nearly succeeded, and the situation for 1/5th Bn became precarious, with both flanks in the air and ammunition running out, but it held its positions until nightfall, when the rest of 55th Division was able to link up from either flank. There was a further counter-attack the following day, which the battalion repulsed with heavy casualties. Its own casualties when relieved on 22 September had been comparatively light given the severity of the fighting: 27 killed and 143 wounded.

==== Cambrai ====
In November the 55th Division was switched to the Cambrai sector, where it made a feint attack on the southern flank of the main assault (the Battle of Cambrai). 1/5th Battalion was not involved in this operation, but on 26 November it had to take over an extended front (over 2500 yards) held with a series of platoon posts. Two days later there was an increase in German artillery fire and it was obvious that an attack was imminent. The divisional commander, Major-General Hugh Jeudwine, visited the battalion at midnight on 29 November and urged the men to 'Stand or fall at your posts'. When the attack came through the morning fog, with a bombardment of extreme intensity followed by ground attacks by the Richthofen 'Circus', the battalion was overwhelmed. While massed German infantry attacked its position, a 'box barrage' isolated the battalion and its headquarters, which were then surrounded and all survivors were captured. Its strength that morning had been 21 officers and 540 other ranks, and all that remained were a handful of officers and men left behind at the transport lines. These took part in the fighting the following day and were then withdrawn.

==== Defence of Givenchy ====
All officers and men absent on leave or on courses were recalled, and 1/5th Battalion began to be recreated on 8 January 1918, when a draft of 300 men from England joined the survivors. A further 100 men came from the 2/5th Bn on 1 February when that unit was disbanded (see below) and the battalion resumed duties in the trenches near Givenchy-lès-la-Bassée at the end of March.

55th Division was involved in the Battle of the Lys, the second phase of the German spring offensive in 1918. When the attack opened on 9 April, the division held Givenchy, with 1/5th Battalion protecting the division's flank on the La Bassée Canal. It had 'A' and 'C' Companies under Major W.N. Pilkington at Loisne Chateau under 165th (Liverpool) Brigade and the other two at Le Preol under 164th (North Lancashire) Brigade. The battalion was heavily engaged by early afternoon, but the front held firm. The following day the attacks continued, being particularly heavy at Loisne, which was held by 'C' Company and the Liverpool Scottish. There the first German onrush nearly succeeded in breaking through, but the position was partially restored by 'A' Company, and the enemy's attention switched to trying to cross the canal. In the evening of 11 April the Germans made another attempt to gain a foothold in the Loisne sector, but Maj W.N. Pilkington led an immediate counter-attack that killed large numbers of the enemy and took several prisoners. Major Pilkington was awarded a bar to the DSO he had won in 1915.

==== Hundred Days Offensive ====
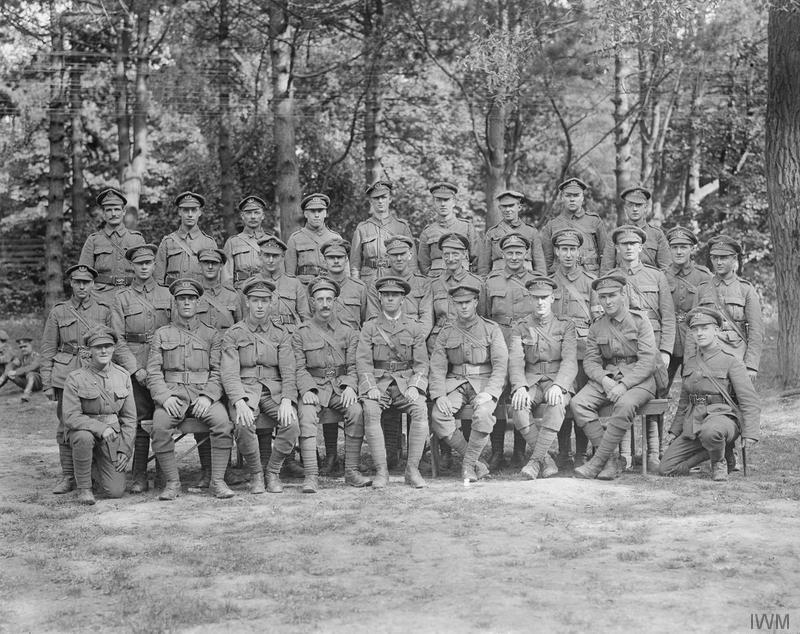
Staff of the 1/5th Battalion, South Lancashires, near Bethune 5 September 1918.

After the fighting died down, Givenchy became a quiet sector, and the 55th Division remained there until the end of August when the Allied counter-offensive began, and the division captured the craters near Givenchy. On 20 September the 1/5th Bn was given responsibility for taking some objectives just north of La Bassée. The battalion attacked with 'B' Company on the right, and 'D' Company with a section of 'C' company on the left, while 'A' Company protected the right flank and the rest of 'C' Company was in reserve. The 'smart little action' was entirely successful, and 'was noteworthy as an example of platoon tactics and the resolute and resourceful leadership of the junior leaders', a number of whom were awarded medals.

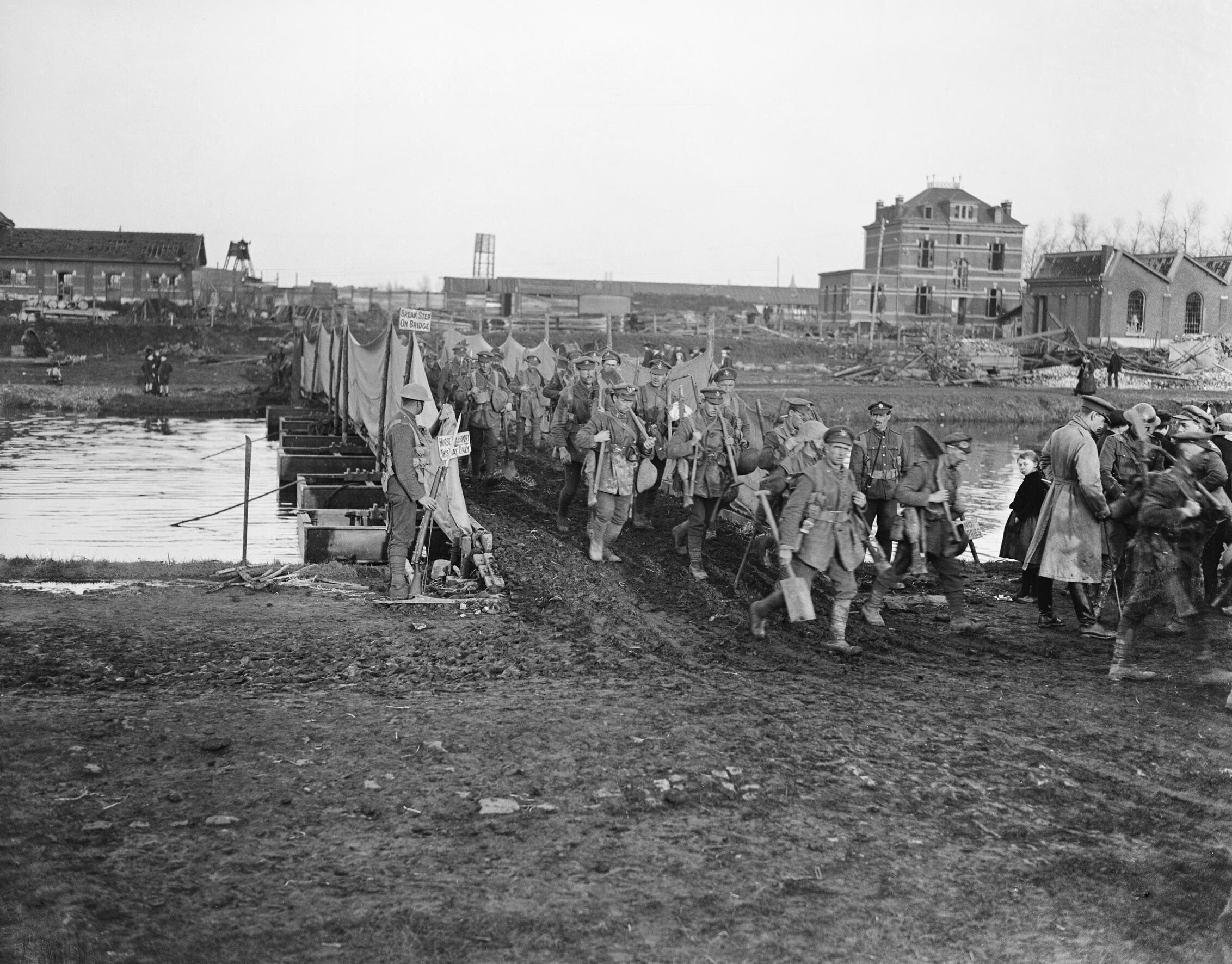
Men of the 55th (West Lancashire) Division cross a pontoon bridge over the Scheldt at Tournai, 9 November 1918.

On 2 October the Germans began a large-scale withdrawal followed up by 55th Division to Tournai and the River Scheldt, which the enemy held in strength. On 22 October the 1/5th Bn attacked Barges Chateau and mill about 1,000 yards in front of its position, but although it reached the objective it could not hold it. The BEF made no serious attempt to force Tournai or the Scheldt, but continued active patrolling and raids, in which 1/5th Bn was prominent. On 8 November, as the Germans withdrew further, Lieutenant H.R. Fright led his platoon in a 'gallant effort to prevent a bridge being blown up by the enemy, in the course of which nearly the whole platoon became casualties'. Lieutenant Fright was awarded the Military Cross. That night a company of the battalion crossed the river by means of a light bridge and secured a foothold for the rest of the battalion to cross in the morning.

The battalion was at Moulbaix on 11 November when news of the Armistice with Germany was received. It later moved to Brussels, where it stayed until demobilisation began in 1919. 1/5th South Lancashires was formally disembodied on 14 November 1919.

=== 2/5th Battalion ===
The 2/5th Battalion formed at St Helens in September 1914 and began training round Blackpool in November. When the 1/5th Bn went to France in February 1915, the 2/5th replaced it in the West Lancashire Division, now composed almost entirely of 2nd-Line units. The 2/5th Bn continued its training round Tunbridge Wells, sending drafts to the 1/5th Bn as required. In August, the Division officially became the 57th (2nd West Lancashire) Division, the 2/5th Bn taking its place in 172nd (2/1st South Lancashire) Brigade. There was a shortage of weapons and equipment, and the men were issued with .256-in Japanese Ariska rifles with which to train. Only in the second half of November 1915 did the infantry of the division receive Lee-Enfield service rifles, and these were in poor condition. They were issued with Lewis guns towards the end of February 1916, by which time the battalions were about 800 strong.

Until the middle of 1916, the 57th Division formed part of Second Army in Central Force, quartered around Canterbury, Maidstone and Ashford. In June it was transferred to the Emergency Reserve and moved to Aldershot Command, with 2/5th Bn at Mytchett, then from October at Blackdown Camp. The division crossed to France and the battalion disembarked at Le Havre on 20 February 1917. The division joined II ANZAC Corps, taking over part of the line in the Bois Grenier sector. During April and May the 2/5th Bn was engaged in mutual raiding with the Germans opposite. The 57th Division carried out diversionary activities on 28 October for the Second Battle of Passchendaele near the end of the 3rd Ypres offensive, but was stooped in its tracks by mud.

The battalion was broken up at Steenwerck on 25 February 1918, and its men were distributed to the 2/4th South Lancashires and 57th Machine Gun Battalion in 57th Division, 1/5th South Lancashires in 55th Division (see above), and 2nd Entrenching Battalion.

=== 3/5th Battalion ===
Once 2/5th Battalion had joined the West Lancashire Division, the 3/5th Bn was formed at St Helens on 20 April 1915 as a reserve unit to supply drafts to the other two battalions. It moved to Blackpool in the autumn, and then to Oswestry in early 1916. On 8 April 1916 it was redesignated the 5th Reserve Battalion, and on 1 September it was absorbed into the 4th Reserve Bn.

== Interwar ==
When the TF was reconstituted on 7 February 1920 the 5th Battalion Prince of Wales's Volunteers (South Lancashire Regiment) was reformed at St Helens, with Lt-Col W.N. Pilkington, DSO and Bar, in command and Maj Guy Pilkington, DSO, as second-in-command. Once again it was in 166th (South Lancashire and Cheshire) Brigade of 55th (West Lancashire) Division in the retitled Territorial Army (TA).

90 cm 'Projector Anti-Aircraft', displayed at Fort Nelson, Portsmouth.

In the 1930s the increasing need for anti-aircraft (AA) defence for Britain's cities was addressed by converting a number of TA infantry battalions into searchlight (S/L) regiments. The 5th South Lancashires was one unit selected for this role, becoming 61st (5th Bn The South Lancashire Regiment (The Prince of Wales's Volunteers)) Searchlight Regiment in 1938. It consisted of HQ and three S/L batteries (432, 433 and 434), and was attached to the Royal Artillery while remaining part of the South Lancashire Regiment.

== World War II ==
=== Mobilisation ===
In February 1939, Britain's AA defences came under the control of a new Anti-Aircraft Command. In June a partial mobilisation of TA units was begun in a process known as 'couverture', whereby each AA unit did a month's tour of duty in rotation to man selected AA and searchlight positions. On 24 August, ahead of the declaration of war, AA Command was fully mobilised at its war stations.

On the outbreak of war, 61st S/L Regt was assigned to a newly organised 54th AA Brigade in 4th AA Division, which was responsible for the North West and North Midlands of England and Wales.

=== Orkney ===
The regiment was first employed manning AA light machine guns (LMGs) in the area of Runcorn and Widnes. In November 1939, one battery was detached to form part of the defences of the Royal Navy's anchorage at Scapa Flow in Orkney. The other two batteries followed in April 1940, and in addition to its AA role, the battalion was called upon to find two infantry companies for ground defence. On 1 August 1940, 61st S/L, in common with all the TA S/L units, was transferred fully to the RA.

=== The Blitz ===
The 61st S/L Rgt returned to North West England in November 1940, when it joined the 1st AA Brigade (a Regular Army formation returned from Dunkirk) in a new 11th AA Division. 1st AA Brigade had responsibility for North Staffordshire, Cheshire and South Lancashire. The regiment supplied a cadre of experienced officers and men to 234th S/L Training Rgt at Carlisle where it provided the basis for a new 528 S/L Bty formed on 14 November 1940. This battery later joined 86th S/L Rgt.

At this time The Blitz was in full swing, with frequent night air raids on the industrial cities. The role of the S/L units was to track and illuminate raiders for the AA guns of the Gun Defence Areas and for the few available Royal Air Force Night fighters. New tactics included grouping the S/Ls in clusters, and later in 'killer belts' for the fighters and 'indicator belts' for the guns. In April and May 1941, Merseyside and the North Midlands were particularly badly bombed (the Liverpool Blitz).

Although operating within AA Command, during the Blitz, 1st AA Bde HQ remained part of the War Office Reserve, and later went to the Middle East. It had left AA Command by May 1941, and 61st S/L Rgt came under a new 68th AA Brigade, with which it remained until April 1944.

=== Operation Diver ===
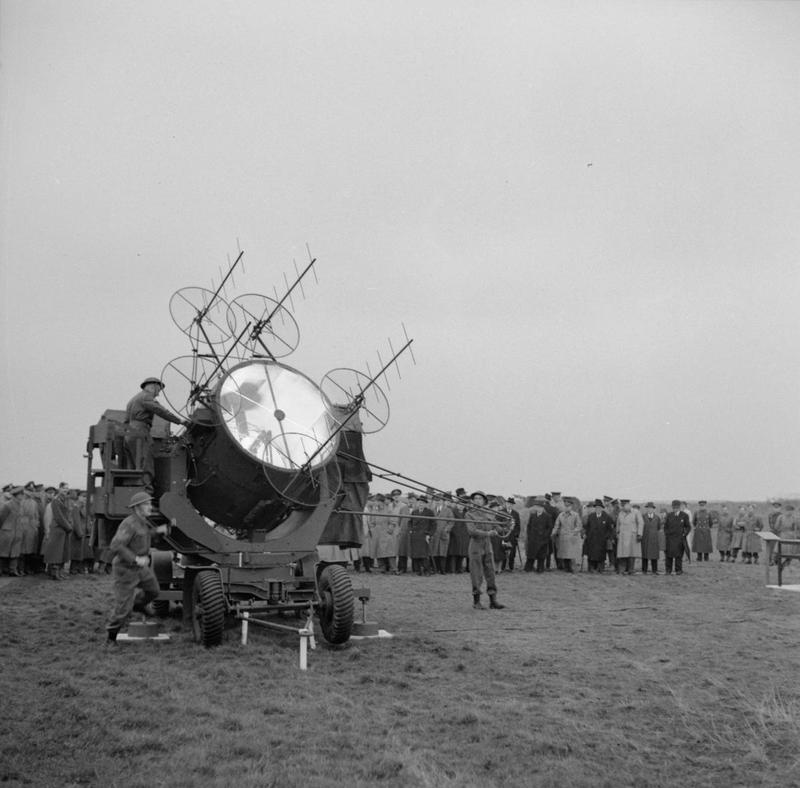
90 cm Searchlight equipped with No 2 Mk VI Searchlight Control Radar.

61st Searchlight Rgt remained in NW England until April 1944 when it moved to Kent, to join 27th (Home Counties) AA Bde. The AA defences of South East England were being strengthened, firstly to protect the concentration of shipping and troops preparing for the invasion of Normandy (Operation Overlord), and secondly in anticipation of the arrival of German V-1 flying bombs. Searchlight Control Radar (SLC or 'Elsie') was important in allowing S/Ls to track these fast-moving unmanned aircraft. During the summer of 1944 61st S/L Rgt was engaged in Operation Diver against the V-1s crossing Kent on their way to London.

=== North West Europe ===
By the end of 1944, the German Luftwaffe was suffering from such shortages of pilots, aircraft and fuel that serious aerial attacks on the United Kingdom could be discounted and the War Office began reorganising surplus anti-aircraft regiments in the UK into infantry battalions for duties in the rear areas. In November, 61st Searchlight Regiment was one of the units selected for conversion, and was redesignated 61st (The South Lancashire Regiment) Garrison Regiment, RA.

Meanwhile, 21st Army Group fighting in North West Europe was suffering a severe manpower shortage, particularly among the infantry. In January 1945, the War Office accelerated the conversion of surplus artillery into infantry units, primarily for line of communication and occupation duties, thereby releasing trained infantry for frontline service. 61st Garrison Regiment was redesignated again, becoming 612th (The South Lancashire Regiment) Infantry Regiment, RA in February.

In April 1945 it crossed to France, where it was attached to 1st Czechoslovak Armoured Brigade and was present at the surrender of the German garrison of Dunkirk. On 8 May (VE Day) it joined 306th Infantry Brigade (previously 55th Light AA Bde) and moved into Germany for occupation duties until it passed into suspended animation in October 1945.

== Postwar ==
When the TA was reconstituted on 1 January 1947, the regiment reformed at St Helens with a new role as 596th Light AA Regiment, RA (The South Lancashire Regiment). It formed part of 59 AA Bde (the former 33rd (Western) AA Bde based in Liverpool).

In March 1955 AA Command was disbanded, and there was a considerable reduction in the number of TA AA units. As part of this reorganisation, 596 LAA Rgt merged with 644 LAA Rgt, which had been formed at Warrington in 1947 by conversion of 2/4th Bn South Lancashires. Together, they constituted 436 (South Lancashire Artillery) Light AA Regiment, RA, in 2nd Army Group Royal Artillery (AA). 596 Regiment formed P and Q Btys, and 644 Rgt provided R Bty; RHQ remained at Mill St, St Helens.

In 1961 the regiment absorbed Q Bty from 253 Field Regiment (The Bolton Artillery), which became Q/436 Bty, and in 1964 the regiment was redesignated as a Light Air Defence regiment.

When the TA was reorganised as the TAVR in 1967, the regiment was merged into The South Lancashire Territorials (PWV), RA, with 436 LAD Rgt finding RHQ, P and Q (South Lancashire Artillery) Btys, while R (South Lancashire Regiment) Bty came from the 4th Bn South Lancashires. However, in 1969 this unit was reduced to a cadre attached to 103 (Lancashire Artillery Volunteers) Rgt, RA.

In 1973 the cadre was expanded again to form 213 (South Lancashire Artillery) Air Defence Battery in the 103rd. In 1992 the battery merged with the regiment's HQ battery, which was moved to Jubilee Barracks, St Helens. The 103rd Rgt remains part of the Army Reserve.

== Insignia ==
When the battalion was attached to the Royal Artillery in 1938, each battery was authorised to wear the Prince of Wales's feathers badge of the South Lancashires as an arm badge. This was embroidered in white on a coloured backing: salmon buff for 432nd Bty, maroon for 433rd Bty and dark blue for 434th Bty, these being the regimental colours of the South Lancs. After World War II, 596 LAA Rgt wore an arm badge consisting of a rectangle divided vertically into three equal bands, in dark blue, gold and maroon.

== Honorary Colonels ==
The following officers served as Honorary Colonel of the battalion:

- Sir David Gamble, 1st Baronet, CB, VD, original CO of the 48th Lancashire RVC, appointed 17 December 1887.
- William W. Pilkington, VD, CO of the 2nd Volunteer Battalion from 17 December 1887, appointed 4 March 1907.
- R.W.H. Thomas, VD, appointed 29 April 1922.
- L.E. Pilkington, CMG, TD, CO of the 5th Battalion from 9 November 1912 to April 1916, appointed 21 March 1934.

== Battle honours ==
The 2nd Volunteer Battalion was awarded 'South Africa 1900–01'. During World War I, the 1/5th and 2/5th Battalions contributed to the honours of the South Lancashire, including 'St Julien', 'Bellewaarde', and 'Ypres 1915', 'Guillemont', 'Ginchy' and 'Somme 1916', 'Pilckem', 'Menin Road', 'Passchendaele' and 'Cambrai 1917'. Units of the Royal Artillery are not awarded Battle honours, so none were received for World War II.

== External sources ==
- British Army units from 1945 on
- British Army website
- British Military History
- Great War Centenary Drill Halls
- Great War Forum
- Lancashire Infantry Museum
- Lancashire Record Office, Handlist 72
- The Long, Long Trail
- Orders of Battle at Patriot Files
- Royal Artillery 1939–1945
- Graham Watson, The Territorial Army 1947
