= Jonathan Davidson =

British civil engineer and army officer

Sir Jonathan Davidson CMG TD MICE
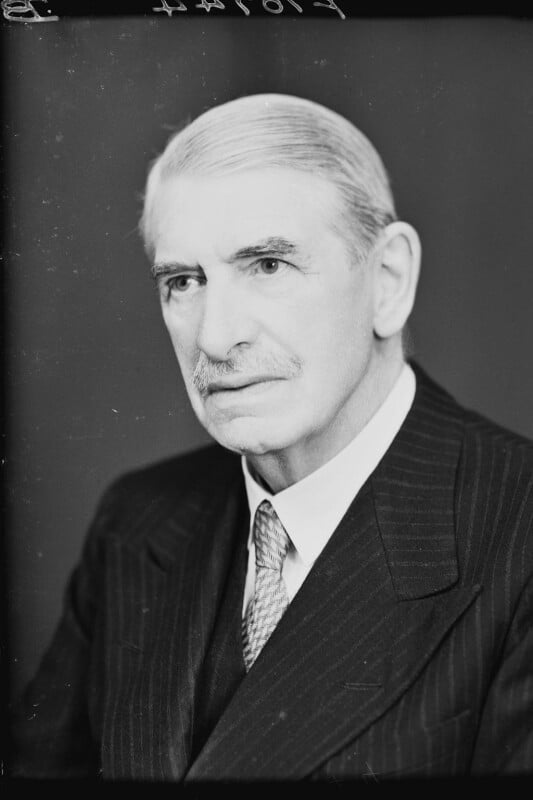
- Davidson in 1948
- Born: Jonathan Roberts Davidson; 29 May 1874; Liverpool, England
- Died: 21 June 1961 (aged 87); Uckfield, Sussex, England
- Engineering career
- Discipline: Civil,
- Institutions: Institution of Civil Engineers (president), Smeatonian Society of Civil Engineers (president)

Colonel Sir Jonathan Roberts Davidson CMG TD MICE (29 May 1874 – 21 June 1961) was a British civil engineer and army officer. Davidson pursued a professional career as an engineer which resulted in him being elected president of both the Institution of Civil Engineers and of the Smeatonian Society of Civil Engineers. He also served as an officer in the Territorial Force where he saw combat as a battalion commander in the First World War with the Liverpool Scottish and was twice wounded in action.

== Early life ==
Davidson was born in 1874 at Liverpool in Merseyside. Although an engineer by profession, Davidson also served as an officer in the British Army's Volunteer Force. His was first commissioned as a second lieutenant in the 8th (Scottish) Volunteer Battalion of the King's Regiment (Liverpool) on 6 February 1901. He received promotion to Lieutenant on 22 November of the same year. Davidson was promoted to captain on 7 March 1903.

== First World War ==
Davidson (far right) fires a rifle grenade from a trench at Ypres, March 1915

When the Volunteer Force was reorganised into the Territorial Force on 1 April 1908, Davidson remained with the Liverpool Scottish, now numbered the "10th", whilst retaining his rank and precedence. He was promoted to major and subsequently held the temporary rank of lieutenant-colonel and command of the battalion from 1914 to 1917. During this time, the battalion was called up for regular service in the First World War during August 1914, leaving Britain for Belgium on 1 November 1914. Davidson and the Liverpool Scottish spent much of 1914 and 1915 in trenches in the Ypres area. During the spring of 1915, whilst at Zillebeeke, Davidson used his civil engineering expertise to significantly improve his battalion's trenches. Davidson was himself injured during the attack on Bellewaarde Farm on 24–25 May 1915 in the Second Battle of Ypres.

During this period, Davidson was appointed a Companion of the Order of St Michael and St George and his temporary rank was confirmed as substantive on 29 May 1916 with precedence of 19 June 1915. Whilst personally rallying the battalion during the Battle of Guillemont in the Somme area in 1916, Davidson was once again wounded in action. The battalion's medical officer, Noel Chavasse, was also wounded during the battle whilst rescuing injured soldiers and in doing so won the unit's first Victoria Cross (VC). Chavasse would subsequently win their second and last VC at the Third Battle of Ypres in 1917. Davidson spent the remainder of the year convalescing and returned to the battalion in 1917. Later that year, he left the unit and returned to Liverpool where he became that city's Chief Engineer.

Davidson temporarily held command of a battalion of the Norfolk Regiment from 14 November 1917. He then transferred back to the Territorial Force Reserves on 9 March 1918, retaining his rank of Lieutenant-Colonel. He relinquished his army commission during demobilisation on 30 September 1921, retaining his rank and being entitled to continue to wear his uniform. After the war, he was also awarded the Territorial Decoration for his service.

== Post-war ==
After the war, Davidson joined the Engineer and Railway Staff Corps, an unpaid volunteer unit providing engineering expertise to the British army. He was promoted to colonel of that corps on 10 August 1938. Davidson was knighted by King George VI on 10 February 1942. He was elected president of the Institution of Civil Engineers, the highest authority in his profession, for the November 1948 to November 1949 session. He was also a member of the Smeatonian Society of Civil Engineers from 1937 and was elected their president in 1955. Davidson died in 1961. The National Portrait Gallery holds five photographic portraits of Davidson in their archives. The William Girling Reservoir in Chingford was built to a design by Davidson.

== Bibliography ==
- McGilchrist, Archibald M (2005), Liverpool Scottish 1900–1919, Naval & Military Press Ltd, ISBN 1-84574-093-9
- Watson, Garth (1988), The Civils, Thomas Telford Ltd, ISBN 0-7277-0392-7
- Watson, Garth (1989), The Smeatonians: The Society of Civil Engineers, Thomas Telford Ltd, ISBN 0-7277-1526-7

Professional and academic associations
Preceded by Roger Gaskell Hetherington	President of the Institution of Civil Engineers; November 1948 – November 1949	Succeeded by Vernon Robertson
