= 166th (South Lancashire) Brigade =

South Lancashire Brigade 166th (South Lancashire) Brigade 166th (South Lancashire & Cheshire) Brigade 166th Infantry Brigade
- Active: 1902-1919; 1920-1939; 1944-1945
- Country: United Kingdom
- Type: Infantry
- Size: Brigade
- Part of: 55th (West Lancashire) Division
- Engagements: First World War

The 166th (South Lancashire) Brigade was an infantry brigade of the British Army that saw active service in the First World War and remained in the United Kingdom throughout the Second World War.

== Origin ==
The brigade was first formed in the Volunteer Force in 1902 from elements of the Mersey Brigade and the Cheshire and Lancashire Brigade. Headquartered at Lancaster under the officer commanding 4th Regimental District, it comprised the 1at and 2nd Volunteer Battalions of the South Lancashire Regiment and the 3rd, 6th and 8th (Scottish) Volunteer Battalions of the King's (Liverpool Regiment), together with a transport company of the Army Service Corps and a bearer company of the Medical Staff Corps.

The brigade continued when the Volunteers were subsumed into the Territorial Force in 1908 (when the volunteer battalions were renumbered), with the following composition:

- Brigade HQ at 21 Victoria Street, Liverpool
- 9th Battalion, King's (Liverpool Regiment), at Everton Road drill hall
- 10th (Scottish) Battalion, King's (Liverpool Regiment), at 2 Fraser Street, Liverpool
- 4th Battalion, South Lancashire Regiment, at Drill Hall, Warrington
- 5th Battalion, South Lancashire Regiment, at Drill Hall, St Helens

The brigade formed part of the TF's West Lancashire Division.

== First World War ==
These later became 166th (South Lancashire) Brigade and 55th (West Lancashire) Division respectively, in 1915. The brigade served with the division on the Western Front during the Second World War.

=== Order of battle ===
The brigade had the following composition during the war:

- 1/9th Battalion, King's (Liverpool Regiment) (left March 1915)
- 1/10th (Liverpool Scottish) Battalion, King's (Liverpool Regiment) (left November 1914, rejoined January 1916)
- 1/4th Battalion, South Lancashire Regiment (left 13 February 1915)
- 1/5th Battalion, South Lancashire Regiment (left 13 February 1915, rejoined January 1916)
- 2/5th Battalion, King's Own (Royal Lancaster Regiment) (joined February 1915, left April 1915)
- 1/5th Battalion, King's Own (Royal Lancaster Regiment) (joined 7 January 1916)
- 1/5th Battalion, Loyal North Lancashire Regiment (joined January 1916)
- 166th Machine Gun Company, Machine Gun Corps (formed 1 March 1916, moved to 55th Battalion, Machine Gun Corps 7 March 1918)
- 166th Trench Mortar Battery (formed March 1916)
- 2/10th (Liverpool Scottish) Battalion, King's (Liverpool Regiment) (from April 1918, absorbed into 1/10th Battalion same month)

=== Commanders ===
The following officers commanded the brigade during the First World War:

Commanding officers
| Rank | Name | Date appointed | Notes |
|---|---|---|---|
| Brigadier-General | A. L. MacFie | 3 October 1911 | Promoted brigadier-general 5 August 1914 |
| Brigadier-General | L. F. Green-Wilkinson | 3 January 1916 | |
| Brigadier-General | F. G. Lewis | 25 April 1917 | Wounded 1 December 1917 |
| Lieutenant-Colonel | J. L. A. MacDonald | 1 December 1917 | Acting |
| Brigadier-General | R. J. Kentish | 4 December 1917 | |

== Interwar ==
The brigade and division were both demobilised after the Armistice with Germany. When TF was reconstituted on 7 February 1920 the brigade was reformed as 166th (South Lancashire and Cheshire) Infantry Brigade, once again in 55th (West Lancashire) Infantry Division. The TF became the Territorial Army in 1921. During the interwar years the brigade had the following composition:

- 4th/5th (Earl of Chester's) Battalion, Cheshire Regiment
- 7th Battalion, Cheshire Regiment
- 4th Battalion, South Lancashire Regiment
- 5th Battalion, South Lancashire Regiment

By 1939 war with Nazi Germany was becoming increasingly likely and, as a consequence, the Territorial Army was doubled in size with each formation forming a duplicate. The 55th Division was scheduled to raise the duplicate 59th (Staffordshire) Infantry Division with 166th Brigade to be transferred to help form the new division. By May 1939 the brigade had been redesignated 166th (Staffordshire) Infantry Brigade and its headquarters had been moved to Beacon Place, Lichfield, Staffordshire.

== Second World War ==
The TA was mobilised on 1 September 1939, war was declared on 3 September, and next day the 166th Infantry Brigade was redesignated 176th Infantry Brigade and transferred to 59th (Staffordshire) Division when that formation was activated on 15 September.

A new 166th Infantry Brigade was formed on 15 August 1944 by the redesignation of 199th Infantry Brigade. This brigade had previously served with the 66th Infantry Division until that formation was disbanded in June 1940 and 199th Bde transferred to the 55th Division. It served in Northern Ireland from 24 July 1944 until it returned to the UK and rejoined 55th (West Lancashire) Division in June 1945, after the end of the war in Europe.

=== Order of battle ===
From when it was redesignated on 15 August 1944 166th Brigade had the following composition:

- 2nd Battalion, Loyal Regiment (North Lancashire) (left for Italian Front 16 October 1944)
- 1st Battalion, Liverpool Scottish, (Queen's Own Cameron Highlanders)
- 1/4th Battalion, South Lancashire Regiment
- 8th Battalion, Manchester Regiment (joined 28 November 1944)

Neither 166th Brigade nor 55th (West Lancashire) Division were reformed in the postwar TA.
