= Liverpool Scottish =

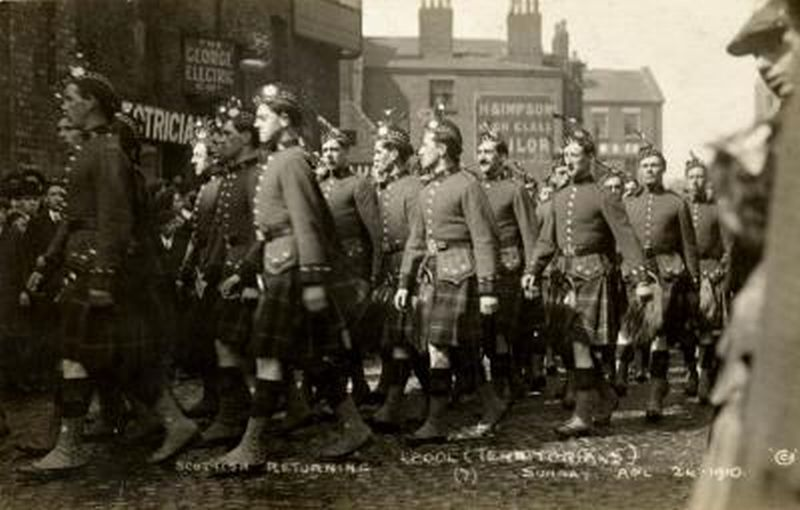
- The Liverpool Scottish, 24 April 1910.
- Active: 1900–2014
- Country: United Kingdom
- Branch: British Army
- Type: Territorial Army
- Role: Infantry
- Size: Platoon
- TA Centre: Townsend Avenue, Norris Green
- Uniform: Glengarry, with blue hackle
- March: The Glendaruel Highlanders; Quick March: Loch Rannoch
- Engagements: Second Boer War; First World War; Second World War
- Decorations: Victoria Cross: Captain N.G. Chavasse
- Battle honours: South Africa 1902; The Great War: Bellewaarde, Somme 1916, Ginchy, Morval, Ypres 1917, Pilckem, Menin Road, Passchendaele, Cambrai, Lys, Estaires, France and Flanders 1914–18

Insignia
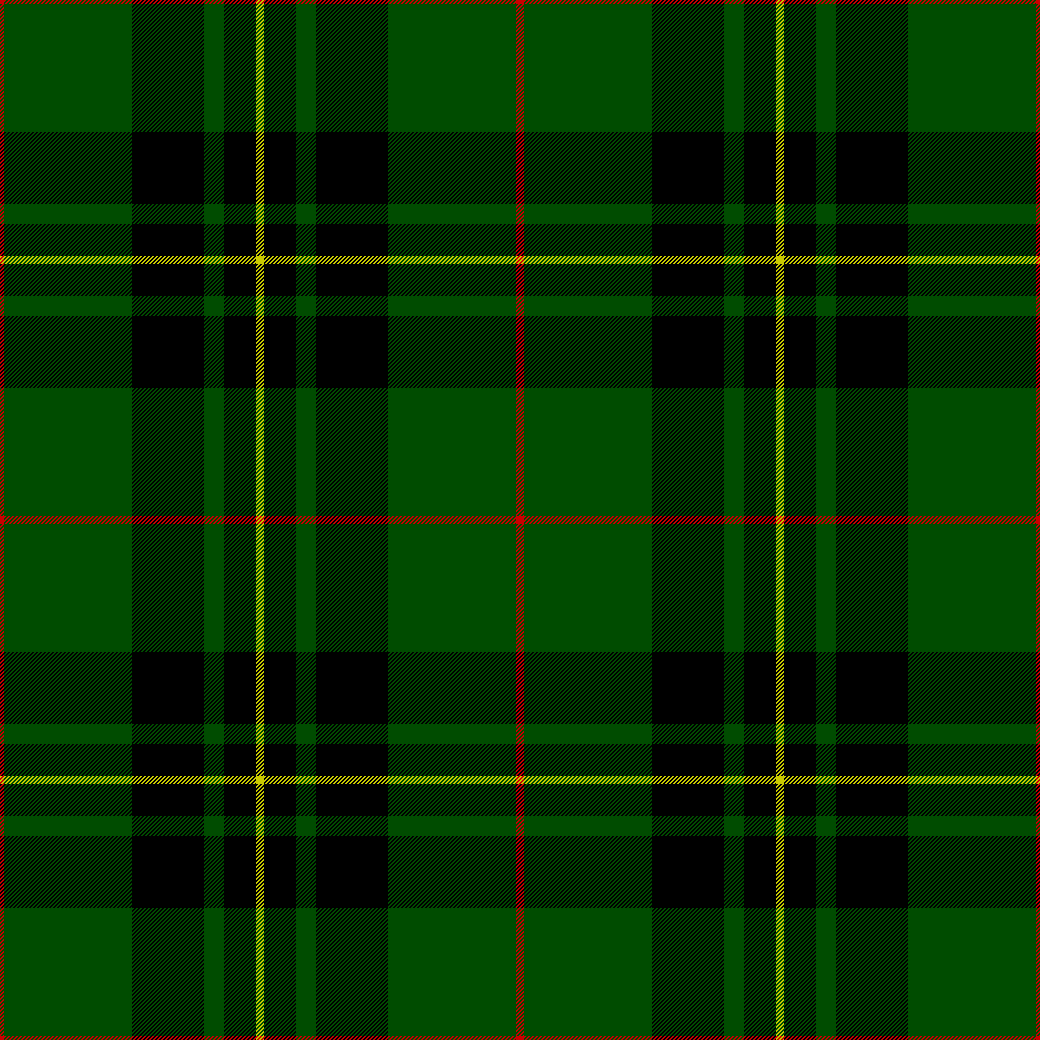
- Tartan: Clan Forbes tartan
- Hackle: Royal Blue

The Liverpool Scottish, known as "the Scottish", was a unit of the British Army, part of the Army Reserve (formerly the Territorial Army), raised in 1900 as an infantry battalion of the King's (Liverpool Regiment). The Liverpool Scottish became affiliated to the Queen's Own Cameron Highlanders in the 1920s and formally transferred to the regiment in 1937 with its identity preserved. Reflecting the Territorial Army's decline in size since the late 1940s, the battalion was reduced to a company in 1967, then to a platoon of "A" (King's) Company, King's and Cheshire Regiment in 1999. In 2006, the company was incorporated into the 4th Battalion, Duke of Lancaster's Regiment (King's, Lancashire and Border).

Service in the First World War was extensive and the Liverpool Scottish was one of the first territorial battalions to arrive on the Western Front when it deployed in November 1914. Approximately 1,000 of more than 10,000 men who served with the Scottish died during the war. The first major battle of the Scottish during the war was on 16 June 1915 in what is officially known as The First Action at Bellewaarde, which was designed to pin down German reserves while other Allied forces were engaged elsewhere. The action is known to the Liverpool Scottish as the Battle of Hooge. Hooge being a village a few miles East of Ypres in Belgium.

The unit's most acclaimed soldier during the war was Captain Noel Chavasse, who was awarded two Victoria Crosses while attached from the Royal Army Medical Corps. Sergeant Albert Baybut, Chavasse's Medical Orderly, is technically the most highly decorated soldier in the history of Liverpool Scottish due to Chavasse's parent unit being the Royal Army Medical Corps (RAMC). Baybut received a Distinguished Conduct Medal and Bar, together with the Military Medal for his actions alongside Chavasse during the First World War. Chavasse remains one of only three people to have been awarded the VC twice and the only recipient from the Liverpool Scottish.

Although expanded to two battalions during the Second World War, the Liverpool Scottish did not serve abroad as intact battalions. Instead, contingents were supplied to other battalions and the Army Commandos. With the commandos, the Liverpool Scottish actively served in operations in Europe, including the Norwegian Campaign and the St Nazaire Raid.

== 1900–1914 ==
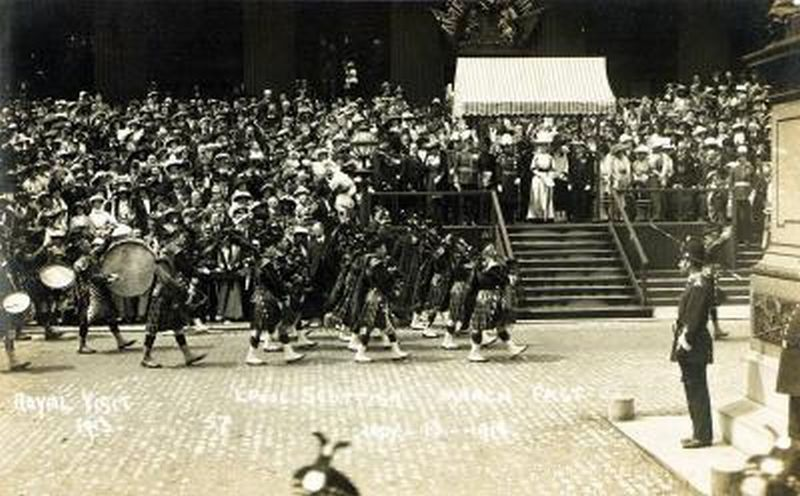
The Liverpool Scottish marching past King George V and Queen Mary during a royal visit to Liverpool, July 1913.

There had been a previous attempt to raise a formation of Scots in Liverpool. Heightened tension with France in the late 1850s had provided the impetus for the emergence of the Volunteer movement. Three "Scottish" companies (one "Highland" and two "Lowland") were formed as the 19th (Liverpool Scottish) Lancashire Volunteer Rifle Corps, composed predominantly of the middle class. Disputes between members over the use of kilts and the colour of their tartan culminated in the 19th's fragmentation. By 1861, four companies of Liverpool Scottish existed within the 19th and 79th Corps. Neither corps survived: the 19th was subsumed by the Liverpool Volunteer Rifle Brigade while the 79th disbanded in 1863.

The Second Boer War catalysed a renewed interest in establishing a unit composed of Scottish Liverpudlians. On 30 April 1900, the 8th (Scottish) Volunteer Battalion was formed within the King's (Liverpool Regiment), with headquarters later being located at 22 Highgate Street, Edge Hill. The Liverpool Scottish became one of four battalions in English infantry regiments to explicitly associate with the Irish and Scottish communities - the other battalions were the London Scottish, Liverpool Irish and London Irish Rifles.

Traditional highland attire adopted for the battalion's dress uniform included the Clan Forbes pattern tartan and the glengarry headdress. A former major in the 2nd Volunteer Battalion, Christopher Forbes Bell, was appointed commanding officer and officially assumed command on 24 October. Bell was succeeded in command by Andrew Laurie Macfie in 1902.

External image
- the Liverpool Scottish
- Museum display of WWI uniform

In common with other volunteer battalions, the Liverpool Scottish organised a detachment for overseas service in South Africa during the Second Boer War. The contingent of 22 volunteers under Lieutenant John Watson was dispatched in 1902 and attached to the 4th Service Company of the 1st Gordon Highlanders. The battalion had already suffered its first fatality after Lieutenant J.A. Bingham succumbed to wounds incurred at Klip River while serving with the Imperial Yeomanry in February 1902. They had only limited duties, primarily occupying blockhouses, as the conflict was reaching its conclusion. Nevertheless, the British Army recognised the battalion's contribution with the reward of a battle honour: "South Africa 1902".

The Liverpool Scottish acquired purpose-built accommodation for its headquarters in 1904 at Fraser Street, in Liverpool City Centre, which the battalion maintained until 1967. The construction of the building was partially subsidised by public donation (some £4,000) but its cost required additional funds generated through a three-day "bazaar" hosted at St George's Hall.

The Liverpool Scottish became the King's 10th Battalion in 1908 when Secretary of State for War Richard Haldane's reforms established the Territorial Force, which grouped the volunteers and yeomanry into 14 county-administered divisions and 14 mounted brigades. By 1914, the 10th (Liverpool Scottish) would be subordinate to the South Lancashire Brigade, West Lancashire Division.

== First World War ==
=== 1914–1915 ===
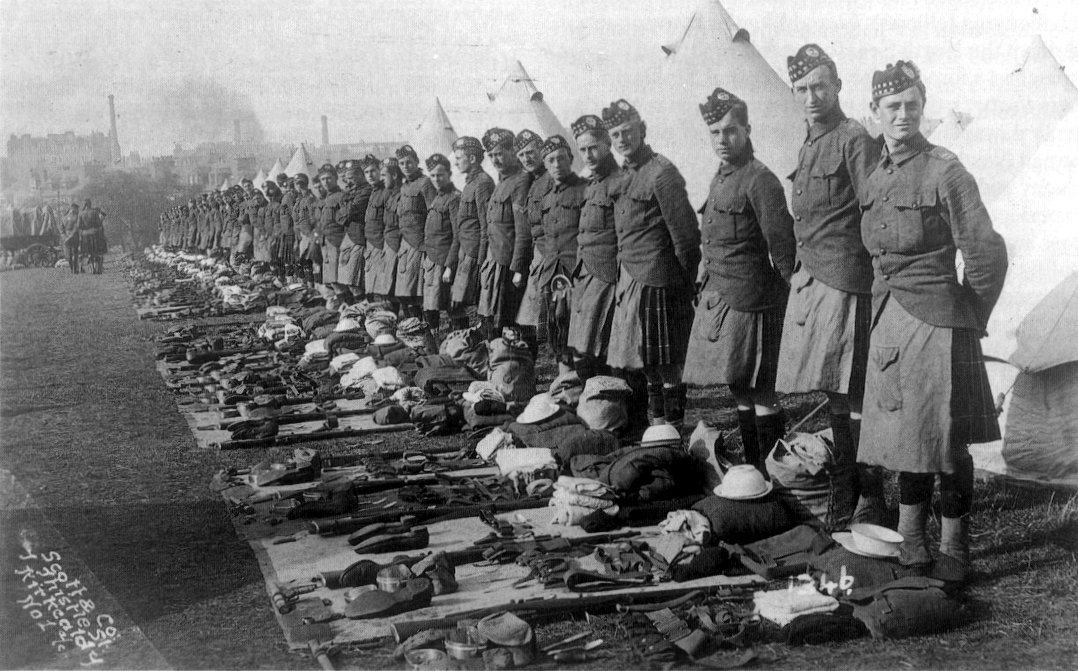
"E" Company parading for kit inspection, in Holyrood Park, Edinburgh, September 1914.

When war was declared in August 1914, the Liverpool Scottish mobilised and moved to Scotland under the command of Lieutenant-Colonel William Nicholl, with the rest of the South Lancashire Brigade, as part of the defences of the Firth of Forth. Duplicate battalions were formed in Liverpool from personnel unable to volunteer for overseas service. The second-line battalion, designated as the 2/10th to distinguish it from the original, was organised in October, the third-line in May 1915. They became responsible for the training of recruits and provision of drafts for overseas service. The 2/10th, raised and organised by Captain (later Lieutenant-Colonel) Adam Fairrie, was committed to the Western Front in 1917.

Considered by contemporaries to be socially élite and reasonably well-trained compared to other territorial units, the 1/10th volunteered for overseas service and became the seventh territorial battalion to be dispatched to the Western Front. The battalion took passage aboard the SS Maidan at Southampton on 1 November 1914, completing its disembarkation at Le Havre on the morning of the third with the Queen's Westminster Rifles. The battalion's original strength - those who qualified for the 1914 Star - became known as the "Maidaners" in reference to the vessel.

Assigned to the 9th Brigade, 3rd Division, the Liverpool Scottish occupied trenches in the Kemmel area, five miles south of Ypres. The 1/10th suffered its first fatality on 29 November: Captain Arthur Twentyman, killed while attempting to return to British lines. The combination of severe winter and trench warfare soon depleted the strength of the Liverpool Scottish. From an establishment of 26 officers and 829 men recorded in November, the battalion had dwindled to 370 able-bodied men by January 1915. Within weeks of the battalion's arrival, Major Blair, Lieutenant-Colonel Nicholl's successor, was replaced by J.R. Davidson due to ill-health. Davidson would command the battalion, albeit interrupted by wounds sustained during the Somme Offensive, until 1917, when he returned to Liverpool to become the city water board's Chief Engineer.

Obsolete equipment and organisational differences with the regular army became some of the earliest challenges that the battalion and other territorials contended with in France. The Scottish employed the long version of the Lee–Enfield (MLE) rifle, which had been superseded by the SMLE (Short Magazine Lee–Enfield) in the Regular Army. Unsuited to newer ammunition and the conditions of the Western Front, the 10th's MLEs began to be phased out by the SMLE in early 1915—a process that would not be entirely complete until 1916. Structurally different from their regular counterparts, territorial battalions were reorganised early in the war to conform with the regulars. Unlike the Regular Army, which had adopted a four-company system in 1913, territorial battalions were still organised into eight companies. When the system was extended to the Liverpool Scottish, the battalion designated its consolidated companies "V", "X, "Y", and "Z". This contrasted with the more conventional "A" to "D" or "1" to "4"—considered by the battalion to be potentially confusing.

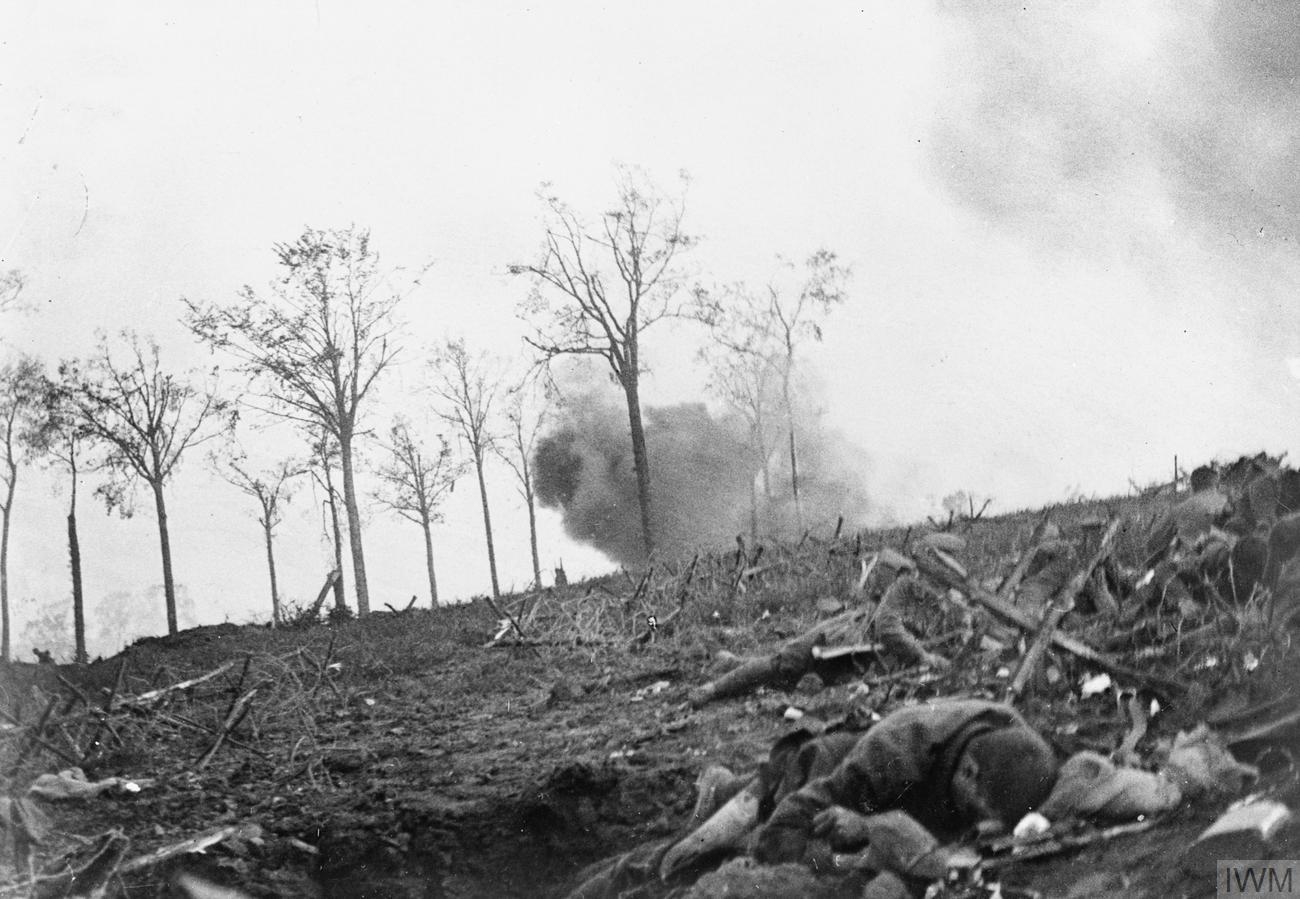
The Liverpool Scottish, 16 June 1915. A shell explodes in Railway Wood, to the left of the German front line.

The battalion's first major engagement happened on 16 June 1915, at Hooge, 2 miles (3.2 km) east of Ypres. The 9th Brigade, with the 7th Brigade in support, was chosen to conduct a three-phased attack with the ultimate intention being to reach trenches on the south-western edge of Bellewaarde Lake. Situated behind German lines was Bellewaarde Ridge, a tactically important feature that overlooked British positions. At 0415, the first wave of troops moved on their objective and quickly secured the first-line trenches, which continued to be shelled by British artillery. The Liverpool Scottish and 1st Lincolnshire Regiment, forming the second wave, then left their trenches to pass through the first wave of attackers and reach the German second-line. Although the advance was relatively unopposed, "V" Company encountered resistance on its front from machine-gun fire. After briefly suspending its advance, the company, reinforced by "Z", charged the opposing positions and took about 40 prisoners.

On capturing the second-line, elements of the Liverpool Scottish decided to consolidate the shallow trenches that afforded little protection. The battle had quickly degenerated into a disorganised and chaotic affair, with British battalions losing cohesion and becoming mixed up with each other. An intensive German barrage decimated the occupants of the second-line trenches, while the 10th's temporary commanding officer, Lieutenant-Colonel E.G. Thin, was wounded by gunfire. The remainder of the Liverpool Scottish continued onto the third-line with portions of the Royal Scots Fusiliers and 1st Northumberland Fusiliers.

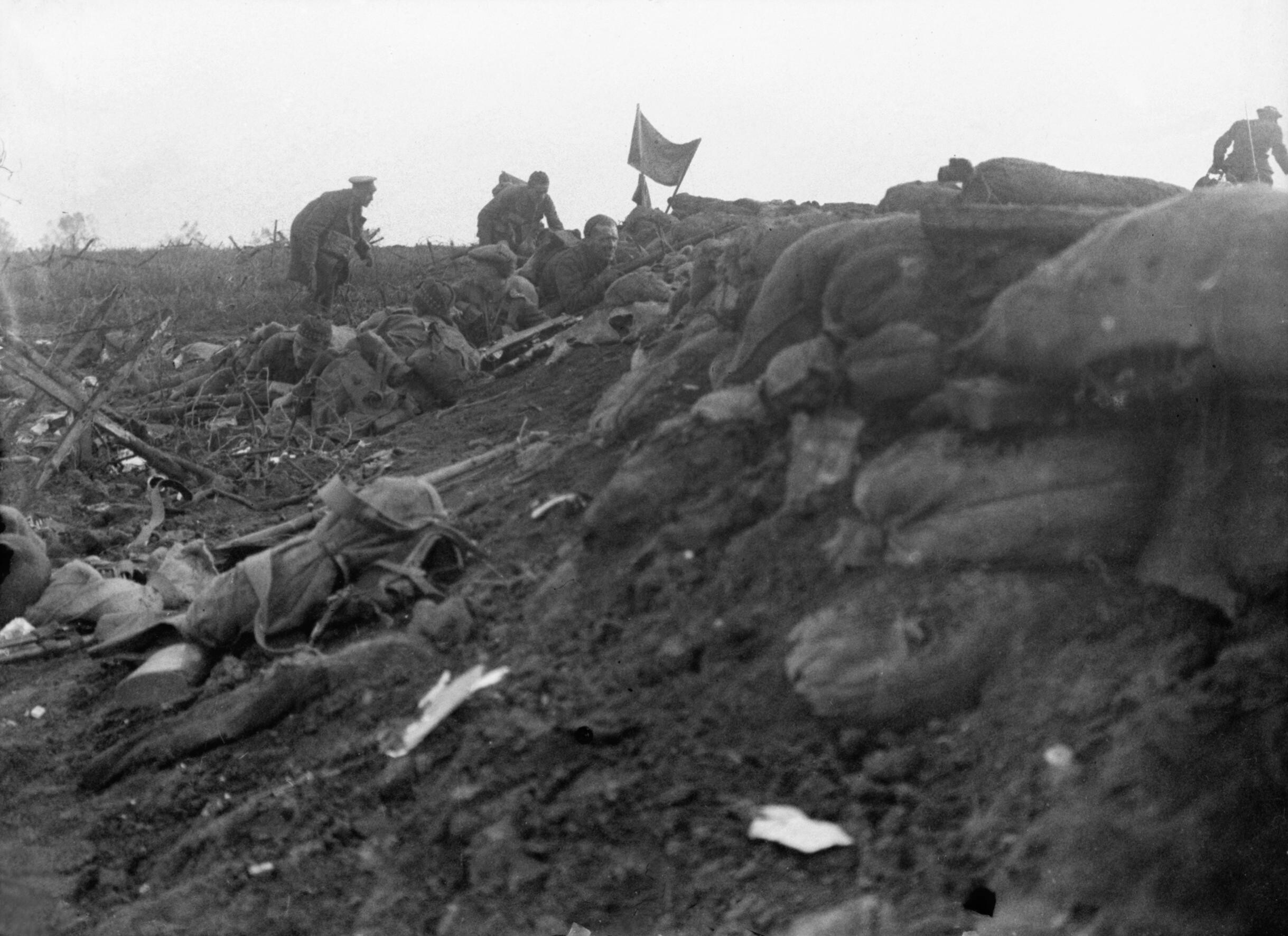
Battle of Hooge, 16 June 1915. In the background, an artillery marker has been planted atop the parapet to signal to the artillery that the line had been secured.

Consolidating the third-line proved difficult under relentless bombardment and determined opposition from the uncaptured right of the trench system. Some of the Liverpool Scottish nevertheless impulsively carried on beyond the third-line, towards a position called Dead Man's Bottom and probable death. The battalion's left flank became compromised in the afternoon by the retreat of the surviving Northumberland Fusiliers. The Liverpool Scottish eventually retreated first to the second-line, then to the more viable entrechments of the former German frontline. The battle persisted into the night, and abortive attempts were made by the Germans to retake the first-line trenches. For about 1,000 yards (3,000 ft) of gained territory, the Liverpool Scottish had suffered heavy casualties: 79 killed, 212 wounded, and 109 missing from a pre-battle strength of 542 officers and other ranks. A memorial to this battle was erected in the area in 2000. An experienced Company-Quartermaster Sergeant, R.A. Scott Macfie, described the aftermath at camp in a letter to his father:

...after a while there passed through our gate a handful of men in tattered uniforms, their faces blackened and unshaved, their clothes stained red with blood, or yellow with the fumes of lyddite. I shouted for Y Company. One man came forward! It was heart breaking. Gradually others tottered in; some wounded, in various stages of exhaustion...

=== 1916–1917 ===
The West Lancashire Division reformed in January 1916 as the 55th (West Lancashire) Division, under the command of Major-General Hugh Jeudwine. Many of the division's original constituent battalions returned and the Liverpool Scottish joined the 166th Brigade. Before being committed to the Somme Offensive in July 1916, the 55th had concentrated in the Amiens area. The Liverpool Scottish moved to the Somme in mid-July and relieved the 18th King's near Montauban on the 31st. After spending six days under constant artillery fire undertaking auxiliary duties in the vicinity of Bernafay and Trônes Woods, the Liverpool Scottish moved to Mansel Copse in preparation for an assault on Guillemont. The village had already been subjected to two attacks since the opening battles of the Somme. At 0420 on 8 August, brigades from the 2nd and 55th divisions began a concerted effort to take Guillemont. The operation failed with resultingly heavy losses. Despite that, the Liverpool Irish and part of the 1st King's managed to enter Guillemont, but became isolated. More than 700 men from the two battalions were killed, wounded, or missing, many becoming prisoners of war.

Amid reports that the Liverpool Irish were holding out in Guillemont, orders were issued for the 55th Division to renew the attack the next day. Resuming the battle on the night of the 8th had been considered before the decision to attack in the early hours of the 9th. The Liverpool Scottish, which had been in reserve on the 8th, was to advance along a front of 400 yards (1,200 ft) with the 1/5th Loyals on its left flank, penetrate the German frontline, and establish itself on Guillemont's eastern boundary. In the prelude to the battle, the Liverpool Scottish waited behind lines, constantly moving to avoid sporadic German bombardment. Further difficulties arose for the battalion when it attempted to navigate to its starting positions through unfamiliar territory, compounded at one stage by the absence of guides. While the battalion reached its destination at 0400, just 20 minutes before the attack was to begin, the Loyals did not arrive until an hour later. Final orders were received late, giving Colonel Davidson only minutes to brief his company commanders.

A five-minute artillery bombardment preceded "Zero" hour, which provoked an immediate counter-barrage. At 0420, the Liverpool Scottish went over the top from the same positions that the 164th Brigade had the previous day. The barrage enveloped the Liverpool Scottish in no man's land, which, combined with machine-gun fire, stifled the battalion's progress. Lieutenant-Colonel Davidson personally rallied his battalion, seeking to regain momentum, but was wounded during the repulsed attack. Two further attempts by the remnants of the battalion to reach the frontline yielded no success. Few had entered the German trenches, the majority having been obstructed by uncut barbed wire. Of the 20 officers and about 600 other ranks engaged at Guillemont, 74 had been killed, 174 were wounded, and 32 were unaccounted for. Most of the missing would later be confirmed killed. Another attempt was made days later by the 1/9th King's. The village would not be captured until September. Among the wounded was Captain Noel Godfrey Chavasse, attached to the Liverpool Scottish from the Royal Army Medical Corps, who was awarded the Victoria Cross. He became the battalion's first and only recipient, and had previously been awarded the Military Cross for his conduct at Hooges.

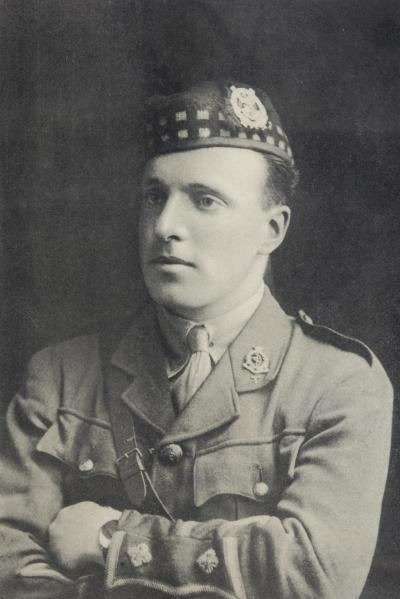
Portrait of Noel Godfrey Chavasse.

In the subsequent battles of Ginchy and Morval, the 1/10th was engaged in a purely supporting role: trench networks were constructed and improved near Delville Wood, and the dead collected and buried. A party of two officers and 100 other ranks was attached to the Third West Lancashire Field Ambulance during the Battle of Morval. After bivouacking at Pont Rémy, the battalion transferred with its division to the relatively quiet Ypres Salient in October. The routine of alternating between the front line, being in support, and in reserve preoccupied the battalion until the Third Battle of Ypres in July 1917. Casualties were nevertheless sustained by the battalion during this period, invariably as a result of shelling and sniping.

The battalion was subsequently returned to the Ypres salient, positioned at Wieltje. On 31 July 1917, a new offensive around Ypres was launched to try to penetrate the German lines, advance to the Belgian coast and capture German submarine bases. The Liverpool Scottish experienced some of the heaviest resistance in 166th Brigade's area, taking heavy losses around the fortified farms. The battalion remained in some captured German trenches until it was relieved on 3 August. Captain Chavasse died of wounds the next day having again tended to wounded soldiers. His actions earned him a posthumous Bar to his Victoria Cross, one of only three men to be so decorated, and the sole double recipient of the First World War.

In September, the Scottish moved south to Epehy, thirteen miles south of Cambrai, where its division took part in the Battle of Cambrai in November.

=== 1918 ===
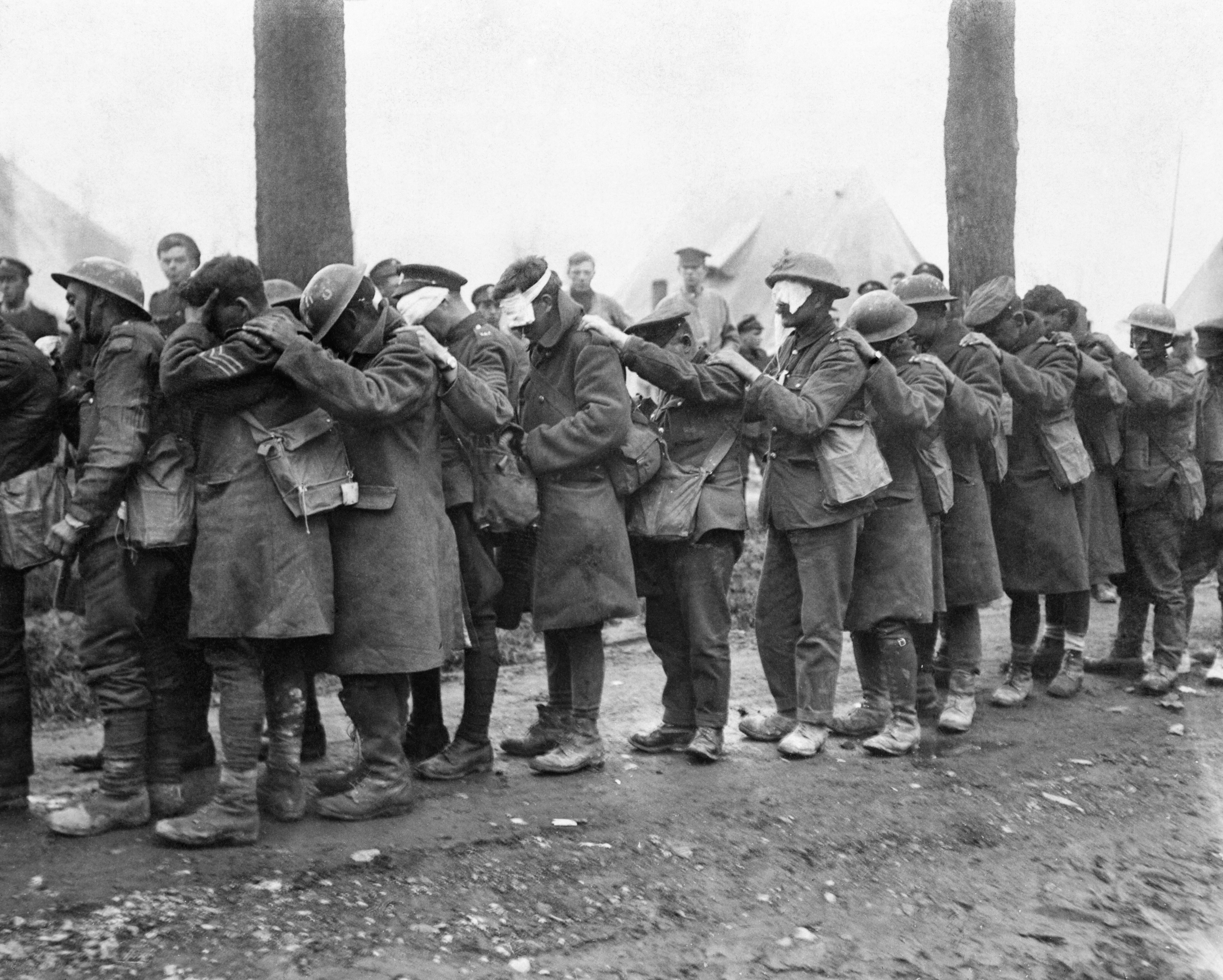
Troops of the 55th Division blinded by poison gas await treatment at an Advanced Dressing Station near Bethune during the Battle of Estaires, 10 April 1918.

On 21 March 1918, the Central Powers launched their expected German spring offensive (Operation Michael), signifying the beginning of Germany's final attempt to achieve a decisive victory before significant American forces arrived on the Western Front. By the 25th, substantial gains in territory had been made in the direction of Amiens. Although prepared for a possible attack, the Liverpool Scottish and the 55th Division did not participate in the desperate Allied defence until the next phase of the offensive, Operation Georgette.

Begun on 9 April, Operation Georgette shifted the focus to the devastated town of Ypres, in Flanders. The bombardment preceding the attack was of considerable scale and included phosgene gas shells, causing severe casualties among the Liverpool Scottish.

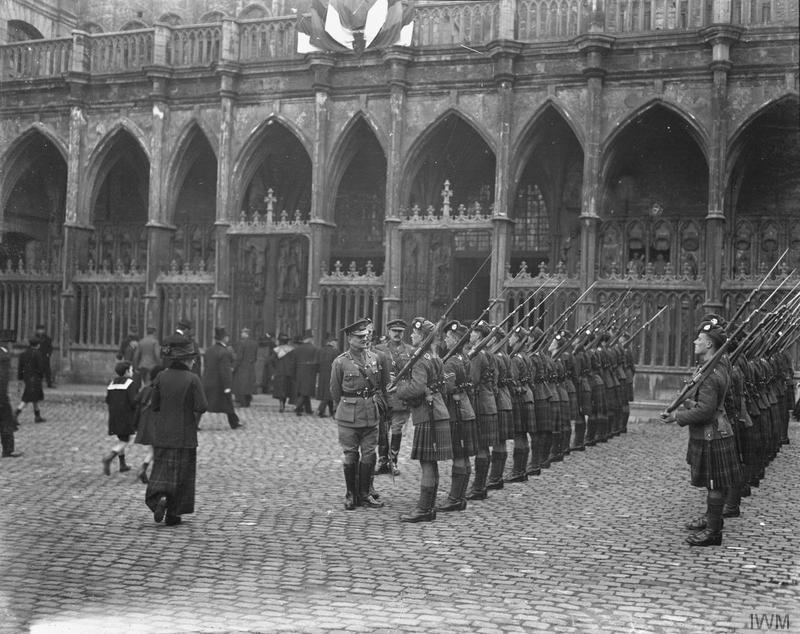
General Sir William Birdwood, commander of the British Fifth Army, inspecting a Guard of Honour of the 1/10th Battalion, King's Regiment (Liverpool Scottish) outside the Tournai Cathedral on the occasion of the Thanksgiving Service, 15 November 1918.

The Liverpool Scottish was involved in the defence of the Givenchy sector during the Battle of Estaires, sustaining such losses that they absorbed the 2/10th Battalion that had landed in France in February 1917. After the Spring Offensive was halted, the Western Front entered its final phase—a series of Allied drives from August to November known as the Hundred Days Offensive. The Liverpool Scottish fought one of its last actions of the war, at La Bassée Canal, in October.

The final month of the war offered little respite to the battalion. In the days leading up to the Armistice of 11 November 1918, the Liverpool Scottish helped to secure numerous villages without opposition and crossed the River Scheldt on 9 November. On the day of the Armistice, the Liverpool Scottish was situated at Villers-Notre-Dame. With the 165th and 166th brigades, the battalion had been readied to assault German positions obstructing passage into the town of Ath. Such a prospect was averted, however, when the 2/5th Lancashire Fusiliers attacked and seized one of the bridges before it could be demolished.

The Liverpool Scottish, with a large number of men not eligible for immediate demobilization, were sent to Antwerp with the Army of Occupation to maintain a receiving camp for Army of Occupation cadres returning to England via Antwerp for demobilization. They remained there until demobilized at the completion of their task in November.

== Interbellum ==
Following reconstitution into the Territorial Army in 1920, the Liverpool Scottish formalised its relationship with the Queen's Own Cameron Highlanders and transferred in 1937 to become the regiment's second territorial battalion. In comparison to the densely urbanised region that the King's Regiment encompassed in north-west England, the Cameron Highlanders area of recruitment in the Highlands was sparsely populated. Although it had its numerical designation omitted, the battalion's identity was preserved and headquarters at Fraser Street, Liverpool were retained. During a royal visit to Liverpool in 1938, George VI presented the battalion with new colours at Everton Football Club's Goodison Park stadium.

== Second World War ==
After the Territorial Army began to expand following a Government announcement in March 1939, the Liverpool Scottish formed a second battalion. The TA was mobilised in August 1939 shortly before the outbreak of the Second World War. On the outbreak of war both battalions were in 165th Bde in 55th (West Lancashire) Division, and remained in Home Forces for the whole of the war. However, both battalions supplied drafts to other units, principally to the Cameron Highlanders, and formed contingents for the embryonic "Independent Companies" that became the Army "Commandos".

=== 1st Battalion ===
From 21 December 1943, 55th Division was in British Troops Northern Ireland. On 14 July 1944, 1st Bn joined 199th Bde (soon afterwards redesignated 166th Bde), which remained in Northern Ireland until the end of the war while 55th Division returned to England. The 1st Scottish deployed to the garrison of Gibraltar in 1945.

=== Commandos ===
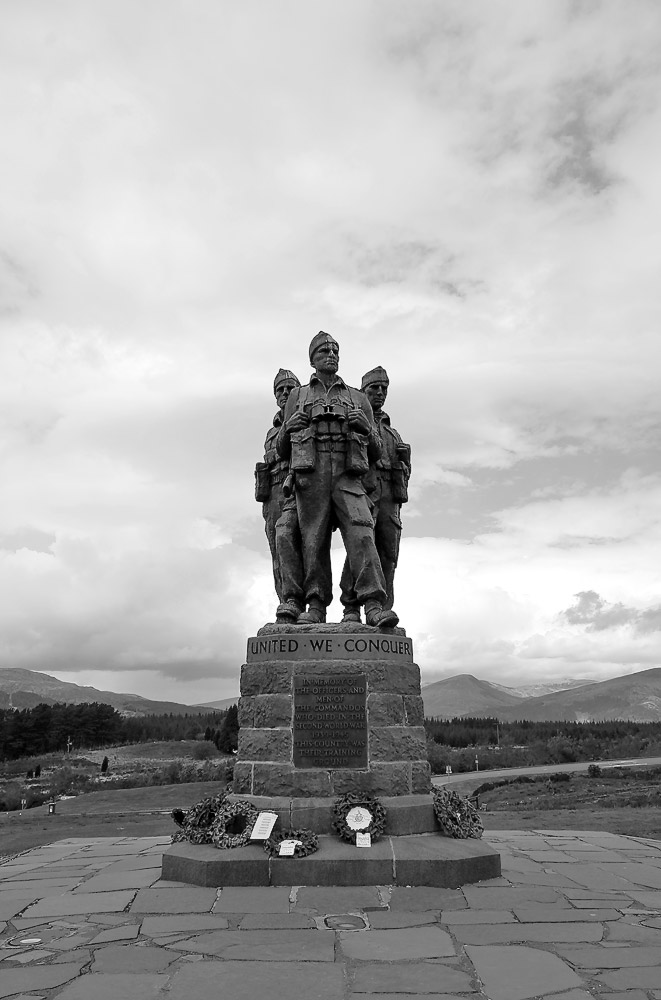
Commando Memorial at Lochaber, Scotland.

The Liverpool Scottish contributed a troop to the composite No. 4 Independent Company, which also contained troops from the King's Regiment and South Lancashires, collectively under the command of Major J.R. Paterson — an officer from the Scottish. Formed on 21 April 1940, at Sizewell, the company soon after embarked aboard the Ulster Prince, bound for Norway to join the Allied campaign against Germany. After landing in early May, No. 4 Company relieved a French force and occupied positions near Mosjoen. The company, in conjunction with others, operated under the aegis of Scisserforce, commanded by Brigadier Colin Gubbins. When a German landing cut off Mosjoen from the north on 11 May, No. 4 Company had to be evacuated by a Norwegian steamer and transported to Sandnessjøen, then to Bodø with No. 5 Company.

By the 24th, Allied troops had established a line of defence near the town of Pothus to facilitate the defence of Bodø against Germany's northern advance. While his forces were engaged in battle, Brigadier Gubbins was informed that the British Government had decided to evacuate northern Norway. The withdrawal of Allied forces commenced on 29 May, with Nos. 1 and 4 Companies being embarked on two destroyers carrying other passengers, including administrative personnel and wounded.

After returning to Britain, the Liverpool Scottish troop obtained approval from the Government to readopt the kilt as an integral part of its Battle Dress. The Commando units and the independent companies consolidated later in the year into "Special Service" battalions, administered by a single brigade. For various reasons, the system proved unpopular and in 1941 the battalions were sub-divided, reverting to distinct Commando units. The 1st Special Service Battalion, which had absorbed No. 4 Company, became Nos. 1 and 2 Commando - the latter included a number of the Liverpool Scottish, designated as 5 Troop.

In March 1942, the troop participated with 2 Commando in the raid on St Nazaire, codenamed Operation Chariot. Conceived to neutralise the western French port as an Atlantic sanctuary for the battleship Tirpitz, Operation Chariot involved 611 men, the antiquated lend-lease destroyer Campbeltown, and numerous small craft. The Campbeltown was reconfigured to resemble a German destroyer but converted into a platform designed to deliver 9,600 pounds (4,400 kg) of explosives.

=== 89th (Liverpool Scottish) Anti-Tank Regiment ===
On 13 September 1942 the 2nd Battalion moved to 218th Bde in Northumberland District. Then on 1 November 1942 it was transferred to the Royal Artillery and converted into 89th (Liverpool Scottish) Anti-Tank Regiment, with Q. R and S Anti-Tank Batteries, which were numbered as 137, 138 and 139 A/T Btys on 1 January 1943. The regiment formed an additional 324 A/T Bty on 25 June 1943.

It became the divisional A/T regiment of 47th (London) Infantry Division on 9 November 1943. This was a reserve and training division serving in Hampshire and Dorset District. It moved to Northern Command and was broken up on 31 August 1944. 89th Anti-Tank Rgt was then assigned to 55th (West Lancashire) Division (by the back in Western Command from 21 October 1944 until the end of the war.

After the war ended, 89th (Liverpool Scottish) A/T Rgt became a holding unit from 18 September 1945 until 10 March 1946, when it began to enter suspended animation; the process was completed about a month later.

== Postwar ==
=== 1st Battalion ===
When the TA was reconstituted on 1 January 1947, the 1st Bn was reformed at Fraser Street as the 1st (Motor) Battalion, Liverpool Scottish, Queen's Own Cameron Highlanders, providing the motor battalion of 23rd Independent Armoured Brigade in Western Command.

In the 1960s, economic constraints and alignment towards nuclear weapons and other military technology resulted in the reorganisation and rationalisation of the Territorial Army. Most battalions were reduced to cadre-strength or disbanded. Although the Liverpool Scottish avoided extinction, the battalion disbanded and reconstituted into two separate units, one of infantry and one of artillery: V (Liverpool Scottish) Company, 51st Highland Volunteers, and G (The Liverpool Scottish) Troop of R (King's) Battery, The West Lancashire Regiment Royal Artillery, RA. Both maintained their headquarters at Forbes House, Score Lane, in Childwall, Liverpool. While the troop with R Battery was reduced to a cadre in 1969 (and absorbed by 208 (3rd West Lancashire Artillery) Battery of 103 (Lancashire Artillery Volunteers) Regiment Royal Artillery in 1974), the company remained an integral component of the 51st Highland until 1992.

During company exercises in Cyprus in 1974, Greek Cypriots seeking enosis with Greece deposed the island's government - an action illicitly supported by the Greek Junta and followed by the Turkish invasion. Unable to intervene in the ethnic conflict, the Liverpool Scottish were eventually evacuated from Akamas, through Greek-controlled territory, to the British base at Akrotiri. Post-Cold War restructuring incorporated "V" Company into the 5th/8th (Volunteer) Battalion of the King's Regiment, successor to the King's Regiment (Liverpool). Further reorganisation in 1999 reduced the Scottish to 2 (The Liverpool Scottish) Platoon of A (King's) Company, King's and Cheshire Regiment. The platoon relocated to Townsend Avenue, Norris Green, where territorial infantry in Liverpool are concentrated.

In 2006, the King's Regiment amalgamated with two others to become the Duke of Lancaster's Regiment. The regiment's 4th Battalion was formed by the integration of the Lancastrian and Cumbrian Volunteers with the King's companies of the King's and Cheshire Regiment. The Liverpool Scottish Platoon remained a part of the retitled "A" (Ladysmith) Company. Individuals from the platoon were attached to other units deployed on operational tours in Bosnia, Afghanistan, and Iraq.

The Liverpool Scottish lineage came to an end, on 30 April 2014, when the last surviving platoon was disbanded, and personnel re-affiliated entirely to the Duke of Lancaster's Regiment.

=== 655 (Liverpool Scottish) Light Anti-Aircraft/Searchlight Regiment ===
The 2nd Bn remained with the Royal Artillery after the war, reforming on 1 January 1947 as 655 (Liverpool Scottish) Light Anti-Aircraft/Searchlight Regiment in the Liverpool-based 79 AA Brigade of Anti-Aircraft Command on 1 January 1947. However, on 22 July 1950 it was merged into 525 LAA/SL Rgt, also in Liverpool.

655 (Liverpool Scottish) LAA/SL Rgt wore a Liverpool Scottish shoulder flash (a rectangle of Forbes tartan) on the left shoulder of the battledress blouse, and this tradition was continued by the Liverpool Scottish battery of 525 LAA/SL Rgt.

== Commanding officers ==
Name	Rank	Tenure	Remarks
Christopher Forbes Bell	Lieutenant-Colonel	1900–1902	Resigned due to ill-health
Andrew Laurie Macfie, CB, VD, DL	Lieutenant Colonel	1902–1911	Later brigadier-general
William Nicholl	Lieutenant-Colonel	1911–1914	Replaced due to age
George Alexander Blair	Major	1914	Replaced due to ill-health
Jonathan Roberts Davidson, CMG	Lieutenant-Colonel	1914–1916	Wounded at Guillemont
F.W.M. Drew, DSO	Lieutenant-Colonel	1916–1917	Later commanded 9th Battalion, King's Regiment
Sir Jonathan Roberts Davidson, CMG	Lieutenant-Colonel	1917	Chief Engineer for the City of Liverpool
James Leslie Auld Macdonald, DSO	Lieutenant-Colonel	1917–1918	Attached from the Royal Scots
David Campbell Duncan Munro, DSO, MC, DCM	Lieutenant-Colonel	1918–1919	Attached from the Gordon Highlanders
Edward Gordon Thin, DSO	Lieutenant-Colonel	1920-1921	Reconstitution of battalion
George Bentham Leathart Rae, DSO, TD	Lieutenant-Colonel	1921-1923	
Sir Arthur Alexander Gemmell, MC, TD	Lieutenant-Colonel	1923-1927	
George Bentham Leathart Rae, DSO, TD	Lieutenant-Colonel	1927-1930	
Benjamin Arkle, MC	Lieutenant-Colonel	1930-1932	
Archibald M. McGilchrist, TD	Lieutenant-Colonel	1932-1936	Author of battalion history
I.R.T. Irvine	Lieutenant-Colonel	1936-1938	
F.W. McGuinness	Lieutenant-Colonel	1938-1940	
H.J.D.L. McGregor	Lieutenant-Colonel	1940-1942	Cameron Highlanders
C.B. Mackenzie	Lieutenant-Colonel	1942	Assume command of 5th (Scottish) Parachute Battalion
R.P. Haig	Lieutenant-Colonel	1942-1943	
J.R. Paterson	Lieutenant-Colonel	1943-	Commanded No. 4 Independent Company
2/10th Battalion (November 1914–April 1918)
William Nicholl	Lieutenant-Colonel	1914–1915	
Adam Fairrie, TD	Lieutenant-Colonel	1915–1917	Reached age-limit
E.L. Roddy	Lieutenant-Colonel	1917	Attached from Cheshire Regiment
Walter Lorrain Brodie, VC, MC	Lieutenant-Colonel	1917–1918	Attached from the Highland Light Infantry; killed commanding 2nd HLI
3/10th Battalion (May 1915 – 1919)
Duncan Alexander Campbell	Lieutenant-Colonel	1915	
Edward Gordon Thin, DSO	Lieutenant-Colonel	1915–1918	Later commanded 2/4th Loyals
Adam Fairrie, TD	Lieutenant-Colonel	1918	Appointed commandant of a demobilisation camp

== Notes ==
- Coop, J.O. (2001) [1919]. Story of the 55th (West Lancashire) Division. Naval & Military Press. ISBN 1-84342-230-1.
- J.B.M. Frederick, Lineage Book of British Land Forces 1660–1978, Vol I, Wakefield: Microform Academic, 1984, ISBN 1-85117-007-3.
- J.B.M. Frederick, Lineage Book of British Land Forces 1660–1978, Vol II, Wakefield: Microform Academic, 1984, ISBN 1-85117-009-X.
- Giblin, Harold (2000). Bravest of Hearts: The Biography of a Battalion — The Liverpool Scottish in the Great War. Winordie Publications. ISBN 0-9539540-0-5.
- Joslen, H. F. (2003) [1960]. Orders of Battle: Second World War, 1939–1945. Uckfield, East Sussex: Naval and Military Press. ISBN 978-1-84342-474-1.
- Norman E.H. Litchfield, The Territorial Artillery 1908–1988 (Their Lineage, Uniforms and Badges), Nottingham: Sherwood Press, 1992, ISBN 0-9508205-2-0.
- McGilchrist, Archibald M. (2005) [1930]. Liverpool Scottish 1900–1919. Naval & Military Press Ltd. ISBN 1-84574-093-9.
- Mileham, Patrick (2000). Difficulties Be Damned: The King's Regiment — A History of the City Regiment of Manchester and Liverpool. Fleur de Lys. ISBN 1-873907-10-9.
- Mills, T.F. "The Liverpool Scottish". regiments.org. Archived from the original on 15 August 2006.
- Wyrall, Evarard (2002). The History of the King's Regiment (Liverpool) 1914–19. Naval & Military Press. ISBN 1-84342-360-X.
- Riley, I. L. (2015). "A Brief History of the Liverpool Scottish". The Liverpool Scottish Museum Trust. Archived from the original on 28 January 2015.
- Queen's Own Cameron Highlanders (1952). Historical Records of the Queen's Own Cameron Highlanders. Vol. VI. Edinburgh and London: William Blackwood and Sons. OCLC 222265108.
