= 103rd (Lancashire Artillery Volunteers) Regiment Royal Artillery =

British Army reserve artillery regiment

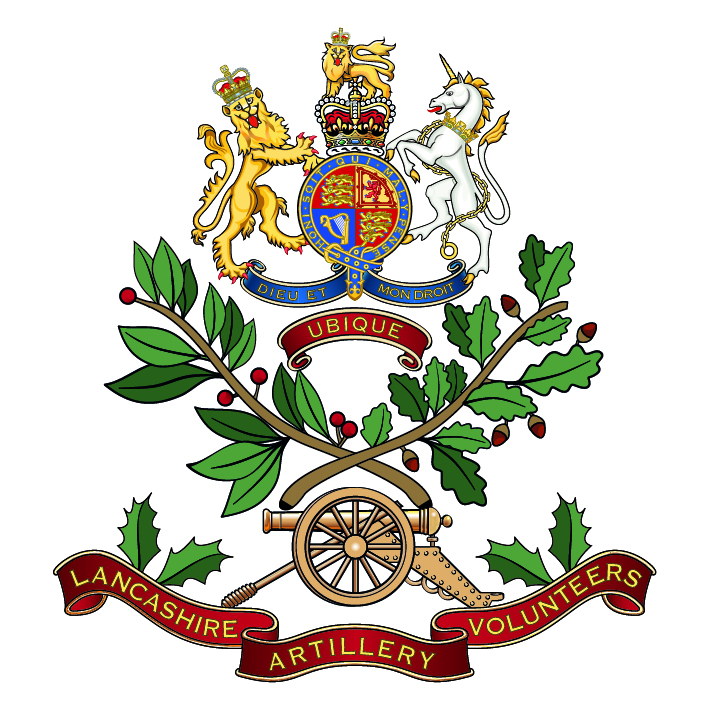
- The crest of 103 Regiment Royal Artillery
- Active: 1967 – present
- Country: England
- Allegiance: United Kingdom
- Branch: British Army
- Type: Royal Artillery
- Role: Field support
- Size: 4 Batteries; 432 personnel
- Part of: 4th Brigade
- Garrison/HQ: Jubilee Barracks, St Helens
- Nickname: The North West Gunners / #TEAM103
- Mottos: Ubique – Everywhere.Quo Fas et Gloria Ducunt – Where Right and Glory Lead.
- Colours: 105mm Light Gun – The Colours of the Royal Regiment of Artillery are its Guns or Weapon Systems. When on parade on Ceremonial occasions the Guns and Weapon Systems are to be accorded the same compliments as the Standards, Guidons and Colours of the Cavalry and Infantry.
- March: The Royal Artillery Slow March
- Anniversaries: 1 April 1967
- Equipment: L118 Light Gun

Commanders
- Commanding Officer (CO): Lt Col Christopher Billups MBE

Insignia
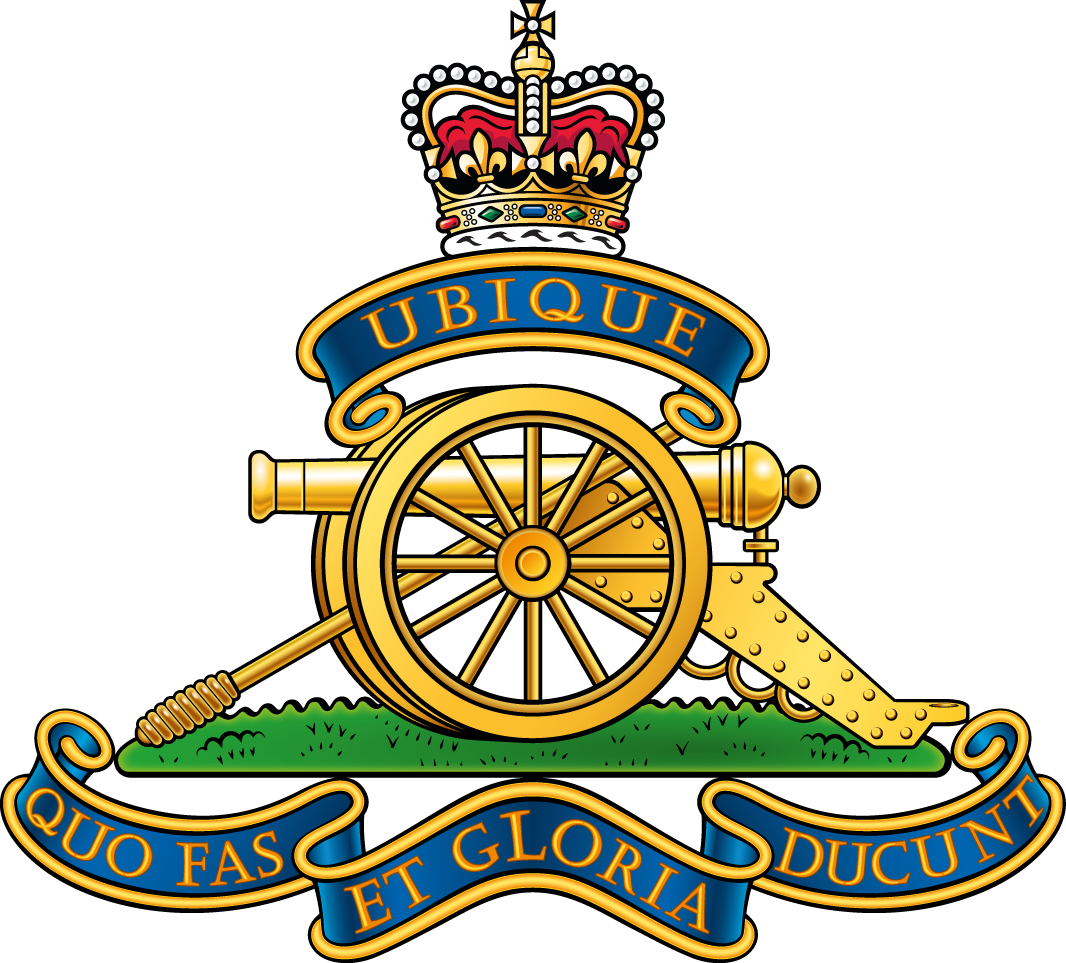
- Cap Badge: The cap badge of The Royal Regiment of Artillery

- Tactical Recognition Flash (TRF)
- Tartan: Crawford (Pipers & Drummers kilts)

103rd (Lancashire Artillery Volunteers) Regiment Royal Artillery is part of the Army Reserve and primarily has sub-units throughout the Greater Manchester and Merseyside area of the North-West of England, in recent years it has extended its footprint to Wolverhampton, Isle of Man, Carlisle and Nottingham. Its purpose is to provide reinforcements for units that use the 105 mm L118 Light Gun.

== Formation ==
The Lancashire Artillery Volunteers were first raised in 1859 as part of the Volunteer Force raised in response to threats of French Invasion. A total of 23 Artillery companies were raised initially. However, in Manchester, numerous units that would later form the Lancashire Artillery Gunners had existed from as early as 1804, when the Duke of Gloucester inspected the Heaton Artillery Volunteers before they were shipped off to the fronts of the Napoleonic Wars.

== 20th-century history ==
Officers and men of the Lancashire Artillery Volunteers continued to give service during the two world wars of the 20th Century.

In 1967, some of these units were amalgamated to form 103rd (Lancashire Artillery Volunteers) Light Air Defence Regiment Royal Artillery (Volunteers). Its units were Headquarters Battery at Liverpool, 208 (3rd West Lancashire) Light Air Defence Battery at Liverpool and 209 (The Manchester Artillery) Light Air Defence Battery at Manchester. In 1969 213 (South Lancashire Artillery) Light Air Defence Battery was formed at St Helens and joined the regiment.

In 1976, the regiment changed its designation to 103rd (Lancashire Artillery Volunteers) Air Defence Regiment Royal Artillery (Volunteers) upon being equipped with the Blowpipe missile air-defense weapon. Then, in 1986, 216 (The Bolton Artillery) Battery was formed at Bolton and joined the regiment.

In 1992, as a result of the Options for Change, the regiment lost one Air-Defence Battery (213 Air-Defense Battery, which was amalgamated with HQ Battery at St Helens) and Regimental Headquarters were moved from Deysbrooke Barracks, Liverpool, to St. Helens to be co-located with HQ Battery.

In 2001, the regiment transferred from Air Defence to the Field Artillery as a Light Gun Regiment.

== Batteries ==
Under Army 2020, 209 (Manchester & St Helens) Battery Royal Artillery increased to a battery size. 210 (Staffordshire) Battery Royal Artillery, based in Wolverhampton, joined this regiment from 106th (Yeomanry) Regiment Royal Artillery, and re-roled to a light gun battery. 103 Regiment is paired with the regular 4th Regiment RA under the 1st Artillery Brigade.

The current structure of the regiment is as follows:

- Regimental Headquarters, at Jubilee Barracks, Saint Helens
  - Lancashire Artillery Volunteers Band, at Nelson Street Army Reserve Centre, Bolton
- Headquarters Troop, at Jubilee Barracks, Saint Helens
- 208 (3rd West Lancashire) Battery Royal Artillery, at Brigadier Philip Toosy Barracks, Liverpool
  - Manx Troop, at Lord Street Army Reserve Centre, Douglas, Isle of Man – formed in 2015
- 209 (Manchester Artillery) Battery Royal Artillery, at Belle Vue Street Army Reserve Centre, Manchester
- 210 (Staffordshire) Battery Royal Artillery, at Wolseley House, Wolverhampton
  - C (South Nottinghamshire Hussars) Troop, at Hucknall Lane Army Reserve Centre, Bulwell – formed in 2018
- 216 (Bolton Artillery) Battery Royal Artillery, at Nelson Street Army Reserve Centre, Bolton
  - Lancashire Artillery Pipes and Drums

== Equipment ==
The 103rd Regiment is equipped with the 105mm Light Gun, a versatile, air-portable and air-mobile artillery piece.

== Freedoms ==
The regiment has received the freedom of several locations throughout its history; these include:

- (England) 14 October 2017: Liverpool (208 (3rd West Lancashire) Battery).
- (England) 27 October 2020: Manchester (209 (Manchester Artillery) Battery).

== Publications ==
- Litchfield, Norman E H, and Westlake, R, 1982. The Volunteer Artillery 1859-1908, The Sherwood Press, Nottingham. ISBN 978-0-9508205-0-7
- Litchfield, Norman E H, 1992. The Territorial Artillery 1908-1988, The Sherwood Press, Nottingham. ISBN 978-0-9508205-2-1
