= 171st Brigade =

171st Brigade may refer to:

- 171st (2/1st Liverpool) Brigade, United Kingdom
- 171st Infantry Brigade (United States)

== See also ==
- 171st Regiment (disambiguation)
