= 165th (Liverpool) Brigade =

Mersey Brigade Liverpool Brigade 165th (Liverpool) Brigade 165th (Merseyside) Infantry Brigade 165th Infantry Brigade
- Active: 1889–1919; 1920-1945
- Country: United Kingdom
- Branch: Volunteer Force/Territorial Force/Territorial Army
- Type: Infantry
- Size: Brigade
- Part of: 55th (West Lancashire) Division; 55th (West Lancashire) Infantry Division

The Liverpool Brigade, later 165th (Liverpool) Brigade was an infantry brigade of Britain's Volunteer Force that served during World War I with the 55th (West Lancashire) Division of the British Army. During World War II, again as part of the 55th (West Lancashire) Infantry Division, the brigade remained in the United Kingdom.

== Origin ==
The Volunteer Force of part-time soldiers was created following an invasion scare in 1859, and its constituent units were progressively aligned with the Regular British Army during the later 19th Century. The Stanhope Memorandum of December 1888 introduced a Mobilisation Scheme for Volunteer units, which would assemble in their own brigades at key points in case of war. In peacetime these brigades provided a structure for collective training.

The Mersey Brigade was one of the formations organised at this time. Brigade Headquarters was at 2 Islington Square in Liverpool and the commander was Major-General William De Wilton Roche Thackwell, a retired veteran of the Crimean and Anglo-Egyptian Wars. Its task was to defend the important Mersey Estuary, including the Port of Liverpool. Originally it was an unwieldy organisation:

Mersey Brigade

- 1st Volunteer Battalion, King's (Liverpool Regiment)
- 2nd Volunteer Battalion, King's (Liverpool Regiment)
- 3rd Volunteer Battalion, King's (Liverpool Regiment)
- 4th Volunteer Battalion, King's (Liverpool Regiment)
- 5th (Irish) Volunteer Battalion, King's (Liverpool Regiment)
- 6th Volunteer Battalion, King's (Liverpool Regiment)
- 1st Volunteer Battalion, Lancashire Fusiliers
- 2nd Volunteer Battalion, Lancashire Fusiliers
- 3rd Volunteer Battalion, Lancashire Fusiliers
- 1st Volunteer Battalion, Cheshire Regiment
- 2nd (Earl of Chester's) Volunteer Battalion, Cheshire Regiment
- 1st Volunteer Battalion, South Lancashire Regiment
- 2nd Volunteer Battalion, South Lancashire Regiment
- 1st Volunteer Battalion, Loyal North Lancashire Regiment
- 2nd Volunteer Battalion, Loyal North Lancashire Regiment
- 6th Volunteer Battalion, Manchester Regiment

By 1895 the Lancashire Fusiliers, South Lancashire and most Cheshire Regiment VBs had been moved into a separate Cheshire and Lancashire Brigade under Maj-Gen Thackwell, while the North Lancashires had joined a Northern Counties Brigade, and the Manchesters joined the Manchester Brigade. This left the Mersey Brigade with the following organisation:

- Headquarters: Altcar Camp, near Hightown, Liverpool, under retired Colonel Robert Shinkwin, who had served with the 59th Foot in the Second China War
- 1st–6th Volunteer Battalions, King's (Liverpool)
- 1st Volunteer Battalion, Cheshires
- Bearer Company, Medical Staff Corps

By 1899 the Brigade HQ had moved to 77 Shaw Street, Liverpool, and the command was held ex officio by the officer commanding the 8th and 40th Regimental District (the King's (Liverpool) district). When the King's raised an additional volunteer battalion – the 8th (Scottish) – during the Second Boer War, it replaced the 1st Cheshire in the brigade. Brigade HQ also moved to Warrington.

In the reorganisation after the end of the Boer War in 1902, some battalions of the King's joined a nw South Lancashire Brigade, and the Mersey brigade was redesignated the Liverpool Brigade, now with the standard four-battalion organisation:

- Brigade HQ at Warrington
- 1st VB, King's (Liverpool Regiment)
- 2nd VB, King's (Liverpool Regiment)
- 4th VB, King's (Liverpool Regiment)
- 5th VB, King's (Liverpool Regiment)

== Territorial Force ==
When the Volunteers were subsumed into the Territorial Force (TF) under the Haldane Reforms in 1908, the Liverpool Brigade continued as part of the West Lancashire Division, with the following organisation:

- Brigade HQ at 73 Shaw Street, Liverpool
- 5th (Rifle) Battalion, King's (Liverpool Regiment) – from 1st VB
- 6th (Rifle) Battalion, King's (Liverpool Regiment) – from 2nd VB
- 7th Battalion, King's (Liverpool Regiment) – amalgamation of 3rd and 4th VBs
- 8th (Irish) Battalion, King's (Liverpool Regiment) – from 5th VB

== World War I ==
When World War I began in August 1914 most of the men of the brigade immediately volunteered for overseas service, although they were not obliged to do so, as the Territorial Force was initially intended to act as a home defence force during wartime. The Territorial Force was, therefore, split into a 1st Line and a 2nd Line. The 1st Line was liable for service overseas and the 2nd Line was intended to perform a home defence role and to send drafts of replacements to the 1st Line units serving overseas. The West Lancashire Division and Liverpool Brigade formed a duplicate 2nd Line units, the 2nd West Lancashire Division and 2nd Liverpool Brigade. To distinguish the 1st Line battalions from the 2nd Line, they adopted the fractional '1/', for all 1st Line units, (1/5th King's) and '2/' (2/5th King's) for all 2nd Line.

However, between November 1914 and March 1915, all the infantry battalions of the West Lancashire Division were sent overseas to France and Belgium to reinforce the British Expeditionary Force on the Western Front which had suffered heavy casualties and was struggling to hold the line. As a result, the division was temporarily disbanded and the 1st Liverpool Brigade joined with its 2nd Line, now numbered as the 171st (2/1st Liverpool) Brigade, and the division 57th (2nd West Lancashire) Division.

In early 1916 the West Lancashire Division was reformed, and now numbered as the 55th (West Lancashire) Division and the brigades were also numbered, the 1st Liverpool Brigade becoming 165th (1st Liverpool) Brigade.

The brigade served with the 55th Division for the rest of the war on the Western Front at the Third Battle of Ypres, Battle of Cambrai and the Battle of Estaires in 1918.

=== Order of Battle ===
During World War I the brigade was composed as follows:

- 1/5th Battalion, King's Regiment (Liverpool) (left 22 February 1915, rejoined January 1916)
- 1/6th (Rifle) Battalion, King's Regiment (Liverpool) (left 25 February 1915, rejoined February 1916)
- 1/7th Battalion, King's Regiment (Liverpool) (left 8 March 1915, rejoined January 1916)
- 1/8th (Irish) Battalion, King's Regiment (Liverpool) (left February 1915)
- 1/9th Battalion, King's Regiment (Liverpool) (from January 1916 to February 1918)
- 165th Machine Gun Company, Machine Gun Corps (formed 26 February 1916, moved to 55th Battalion, Machine Gun Corps 7 March 1918)
- 165th Trench Mortar Battery (formed March 1916)

== Between the wars ==
The brigade was disbanded after the war in 1919 when the Territorial Force was disbanded. It was later renamed in 1920 as the Territorial Army. The brigade came into existence again as the 165th (Liverpool) Infantry Brigade, again assigned to the 55th (West Lancashire Division) and again had the same four battalions of the King's Regiment (Liverpool). However, under the Geddes Axe, the 8th (Irish) Battalion was disbanded on 31 March 1922 and were replaced in the brigade by the 10th (Scottish) Battalion, previously from the 166th (South Lancashire) Infantry Brigade.

The composition of the brigade remained unchanged throughout most of the inter-war years. In the late 1930s, however, many infantry battalions of the Territorial Army were converted to new roles, mainly anti-aircraft or searchlight units. The 6th (Rifle) Battalion was transferred to the Royal Engineers and converted to 38th (The King's) Anti-Aircraft Battalion, Royal Engineers, assigned to the 33rd (Western) Anti-Aircraft Group, 2nd Anti-Aircraft Division, serving alongside other units converted from infantry battalions. They were replaced in the brigade by the 4th/5th Battalion, Cheshire Regiment. In 1938, the 10th (Scottish) Battalion was transferred to the Queen's Own Cameron Highlanders and was re-titled as the Liverpool Scottish but remained with the brigade. In the same year, when all infantry brigades of the British Army were reduced from four to three battalions, the 7th Battalion, King's was transferred to the Royal Tank Regiment and became 40th (The King's) Royal Tank Regiment, assigned to 23rd Army Tank Brigade. The 7th Battalion was replaced by 4th Battalion, South Lancashire Regiment, previously from 166th (South Lancashire) Infantry Brigade. The brigade no longer being solely from Liverpool, it was redesignated 165th (Merseyside) Infantry Brigade, and finally simply 165th Infantry Brigade.

== World War II ==
The brigade again served in World War II with the 55th Division throughout the war, but by October 1941 was no longer was an operational formation to be sent overseas. In January 1942 it was reduced to a Lower Establishment yet it was not reduced to a training division as were most other low establishment formations. In December 1943, with the division, the brigade was sent to Northern Ireland and was raised to a Higher Establishment in May 1944, before returning to the United Kingdom in July. It served there until the war finally ended in 1945 and the division was disbanded in 1946 and was not reformed.

=== Order of Battle ===
During World War II the brigade was composed as follows:

- 5th Battalion, King's Regiment (Liverpool) (to 1 April 1943)
- 1st Battalion, Liverpool Scottish, (Queen's Own Cameron Highlanders) (to 13 July 1944)
- 2nd Battalion, Liverpool Scottish, (Queen's Own Cameron Highlanders) (to 13 September 1942)
- 165th Infantry Brigade Anti-Tank Company (formed 14 September 1940, disbanded 26 December 1941)
- 10th Battalion, Duke of Wellington's Regiment (from 13 September 1942 to 13 July 1944)
- 9th Battalion, King's Regiment (Liverpool) (from 12 April 1943 to 12 July 1944)
- 4th Battalion, Black Watch (Royal Highland Regiment) (from 26 July 1944)
- 2nd Battalion, Royal Irish Fusiliers (from 26 July 1944)
- 5th Battalion, West Yorkshire Regiment (from 26 July 1944)

== Recipients of the Victoria Cross ==
- Private Arthur Herbert Procter, 1/5th Battalion, King's Regiment (Liverpool)
