= Liverpool Irish =

- Active: 1860–1922, 1939–present
- Country: United Kingdom
- Branch: Army Reserve
- Type: Field Artillery
- Size: Troop
- TA Centre: Aigburth Road, Liverpool
- Nickname: The Irish Brigade (arcane)
- Motto: Some versions of the cap badge featured the motto Erin Go Bragh (Ireland Forever) within a scroll
- Uniform: Caubeen headress Pipers: Saffron kilt crawford tartans, green shawls
- Equipment: L118 Light Gun
- Decorations: Victoria Cross: 2nd Lt. E.F. Baxter
- Battle honours: South Africa 1900-02

Commanders
- Honorary Colonel: Valentine Charles, 5th Earl of Kenmare, CVO (1906)

The Liverpool Irish is a unit of the British Army's Territorial Army, raised in 1860 as a volunteer corps of infantry. Conversion to an anti-aircraft regiment occurred in 1947, but the regimental status of the Liverpool Irish ceased in 1955 upon reduction to a battery. Since 1967, the lineage of the Liverpool Irish has been perpetuated by "A" Troop, in 208 (3rd West Lancashire) Battery, 103rd (Lancashire Artillery Volunteers) Regiment. The 103rd has provided individual reinforcements to regular artillery regiments equipped with the AS-90 and L118.

Liverpool's large Irish community formed the 64th Lancashire Rifle Volunteer Corps on 25 April 1860, one of many volunteer corps raised in Lancashire in response to heightened tension with France. The Liverpool Irish became a volunteer (later Territorial Force) battalion of the King's (Liverpool Regiment) in July 1881. As such, it fought in the Second Boer War and First World War, sustaining thousands of casualties in numerous battles that prominently included Givenchy, Guillemont, Third Ypres, and the Hundred Days Offensive. Disbanded after the Great War in 1922, the Liverpool Irish reformed in 1939 before the Second World War and constituted the nucleus of the 7th Beach Group that landed at Juno Beach on 6 June 1944, D-Day.

Irish heritage was asserted in the traditions and uniform of the Liverpool Irish. Once adopting a uniform similar in appearance to the Royal Irish Rifles, the Liverpool Irish eventually wore the caubeen headdress with red and blue hackle; the attire of pipers the battalion maintained on its strength included the saffron kilt and shawl. While the battalion derived pride from its Irish identity, some, including the 17th Earl of Derby, associated Irish status with indiscipline and disobedience, which the Liverpool Irish gained a reputation for.

== History ==
=== 1860–1914 ===
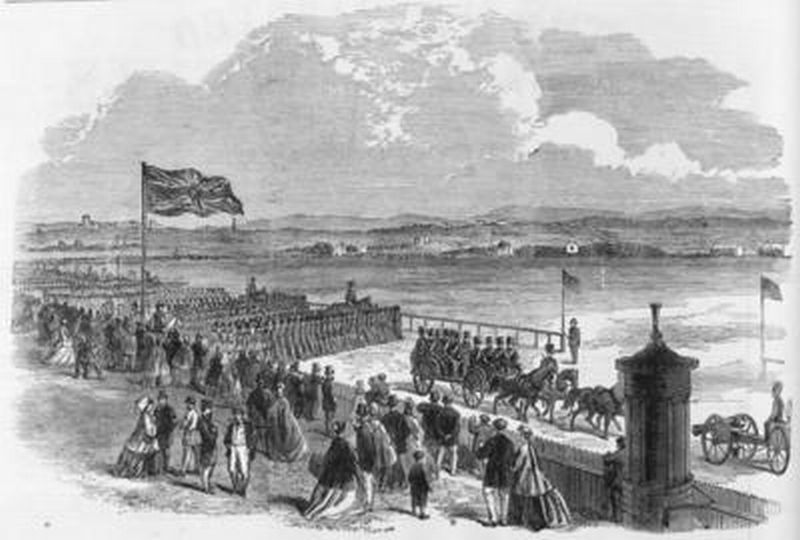
Reviews of the Lancashire Rifle Volunteer Corps were held annually. They became important social events, attracting large attendances; in 1864, it was estimated that more than 30,000 people were present at the review conducted at Aintree Racecourse.

Poverty and famine drove many Irish to Liverpool during the 19th Century, whether as settlers or transmigrants. By 1851, it was estimated that 22.3 per cent (83,813) of the town's populace was Irish-born. In the late 1850s, heightened tension between Crimean War allies France and Britain inspired the development of a military volunteer movement, mostly amongst the middle classes. The populace of Lancashire, including the port of Liverpool, organised corps of varying sizes, the most senior being the 1st Lancashire (Liverpool) Rifle Volunteer Corps, formed by Captain Nathaniel Bousfield in June 1859. (Note: Bousfield was a Liverpool cotton broker who had been trying to raise interest in the Rifle Volunteer Movement since 1852. He had the distinction of being the first officer commissioned into the new Volunteer Force.) On 5 December 1859, an advertisement published in the Liverpool Daily Post appealed to interested parties within Liverpool's Irish community to assemble at the London, Clayton Square. Those who attended the meeting determined an Irish corps would be viable. By January, the corps had quickly developed into a coherent body and arranged its first drill at the Concert Hall, Lord Nelson Street. Shortly after its official constitution on 25 April, the 64th Corps, for a brief period, became incorporated into the 2nd Administrative Battalion, formed to organise other volunteer units in the county. The corps had six companies by September 1863, and the "Liverpool Irish" designation was formally granted in 1864.

James Gunning Plunkett, a young lieutenant in the 5th Regiment of Royal Lancashire Militia, became the corps first commanding officer when appointed Captain-Commandant in 1860. He resigned in 1861 and was succeeded by Captain Peter Silvester Bidwill (or Bidwell), who attained the rank of lieutenant-colonel in 1863 and held command for almost 23 years. A Catholic importer of corn and Liberal, Bidwill and the corps were subject to accusations of Irish Republican sympathy and even the provision of military training to nationalists. Conversely, Bidwill was an avowed opponent of home rule in Ireland and refuted the accusations expressed during his tenure of command. Some members were indeed aligned with the movement and associated with the Irish Republican Brotherhood In his autobiography The Life Story of an Old Rebel, nationalist John Denvir claimed volunteers from Ireland had insisted they joined the 64th with the intent of "learning and perfecting themselves in the use of arms". Nevertheless, nationalist organisations based in Liverpool endeavoured to discourage prospective volunteers and condemned those who joined the corps.

When the Rifle Volunteer Corps were consolidated, the Liverpool Irish was renumbered 18th Lancashire RVC on 3 September 1880. Under the localisation scheme implemented by the Cardwell-Childers reforms of the Army, the Liverpool Irish became a Volunteer Battalion of the King's (Liverpool Regiment) on 1 July 1881 and was redesignated the 5th (Irish) Volunteer Battalion of the regiment on 1 March 1888. The Volunteer Force was not mobilised during the Second Boer War, but the battalion provided 224 volunteers for service in South Africa, with some sent as drafts for the Imperial Yeomanry and 1st King's. More than one hundred of the volunteers formed a service company for attachment to the 1st Royal Irish Regiment. The company served for ten months and returned to Britain in November 1900, having fought at Belfast, Bethlehem, Klip Flat Drift, Lydenburg, Sand River Draft, and Slabbert's Nek. On returning to Liverpool, the company marched to St George's Hall, to be greeted by the Lord Mayor and relatives. The contribution of the Liverpool Irish was recognised with the awarding of a battle honour, "South Africa 1900-02".

The Haldane Reforms of 1908 replaced the Volunteer Force with the Territorial Force, which was organised into 14 infantry divisions. The battalion, renumbered the 8th, became subordinated to the Liverpool Brigade, West Lancashire Division. Territorial infantry battalions inherited the composition of their volunteer predecessors: eight companies, each commanded by a captain or major. This structure was superseded by a four-company system first adopted by the Regular Army in 1913 and extended to the Territorial Force during the First World War. Before its restructuring, the 8th (Irish) maintained a company of bicycle infantry – a variant of mounted infantry that had acquired popularity amongst contemporary armies. All eight companies concentrated at Shaw Street, where the battalion housed its headquarters. A strength of 942 officers and other ranks was recorded in 1910, at which time the battalion's commanding officer was Colonel J.A. Cooney.

=== First World War ===
==== 1914–1916 ====
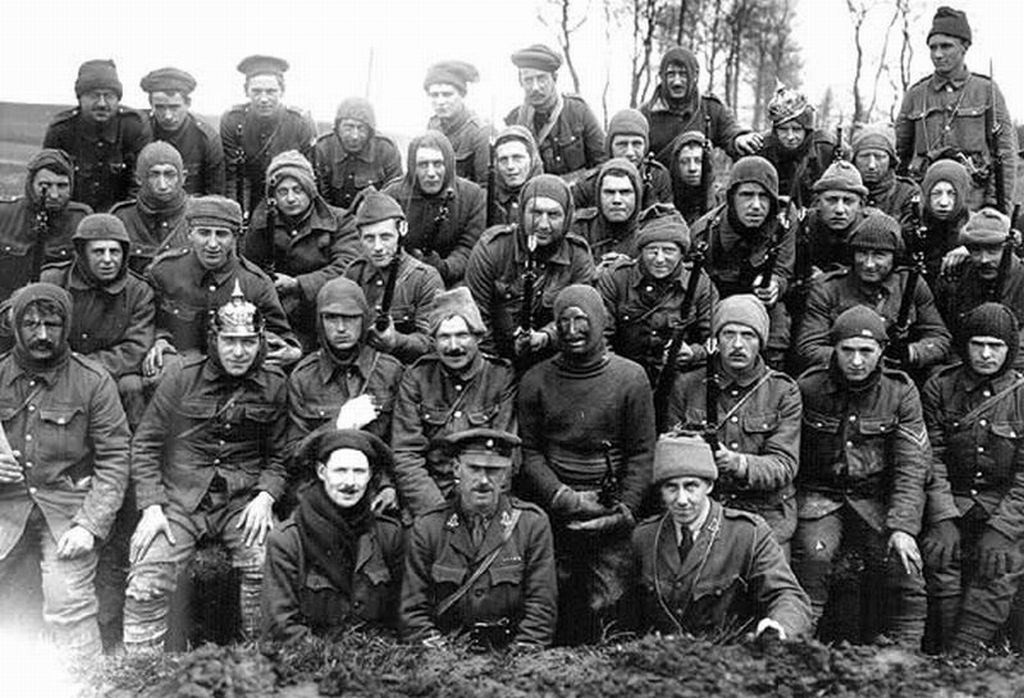
The Liverpool Irish assembled for a photograph after they had conducted the 55th Division's first major action in April 1916.

At the onset of war, in August 1914, the Liverpool Irish mobilised and moved to Canterbury, in Kent. Two duplicate battalions of the Liverpool Irish were raised in October 1914 and May 1915, designated as the 2/8th and 3/8th respectively. Soldiers unable to volunteer for overseas service formed the nucleus of the 2/8th, which trained recruits and supplied deployed units with drafts. The 2/8th was itself sent to the Western Front in February 1917, with the 57th (2nd West Lancashire) Division's 171st (2/1st Liverpool) Brigade. The third-line remained in England and was responsible for the training of recruits. It was absorbed by the 7th (Reserve) Battalion, West Lancashire Reserve Brigade in September 1916.

The 1/8th transferred to the North Lancashire Brigade in February 1915 and landed at Boulogne in May, one-month after the brigade was assigned to the 51st (Highland) Division. Heavy casualties were sustained in the battalion's first engagement of the war, in the Second Action of Givenchy (15–16 June). The attack by IV Corps was designed to support a renewed French offensive in Artois and secure the elevated ground near Violaines. Initially in reserve at Le Touret, the Liverpool Irish was committed after it received orders to deploy to fire trenches in support of the battle. As the only battalion remaining in the brigade able to undertake offensive action, the other three having incurred heavy losses on the first-day, the 1/8th was ordered to renew the attack in the afternoon of the 16th. Companies were to advance sequentially, beginning with "C", then "A", "B", and "D". After a preliminary bombardment of 45-minutes, the Liverpool Irish, commanded by Major J.A.C. Johnson, departed its trenches at 4:45pm. A maelstrom of fire confronted the men of "C" Company; nearly all fell in no man's land without reaching the German frontline. The three companies that followed encountered similarly intense opposition. Some did penetrate the German first-line, but their numbers were insufficient to retain possession of the captured territory. Retirement to British lines was completed by midnight and the battalion subsequently returned to Le Touret. In the three days engaged in the Givenchy sector, the 1/8th had suffered 232 casualties.

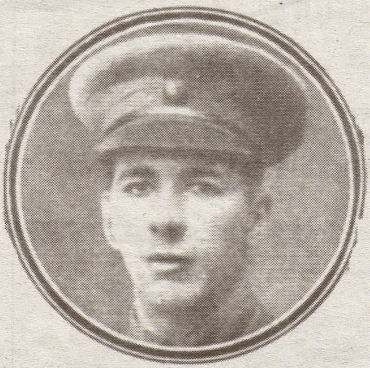
Second-Lieutenant E.F. Baxter

Orders were received in early January that the Liverpool Irish and its brigade were to transfer to the 55th (West Lancashire) Division. Dismantled in the early stages of the war when its constituent battalions were deployed to overseas theatres, the 55th reformed at Hallencourt under command of Major-General Hugh Jeudwine. Specially-trained volunteers from the Liverpool Irish were selected to conduct the division's first major raid on German trenches, at Ransart on the night of 17 April. Split into two parties of wirecutters and raiders, the Liverpool Irish entered the trench system and proceeded to grenade three dug-outs and destroy a munitions store The raiders' sole fatality, Second-Lieutenant Edward Felix Baxter, was awarded a posthumous Victoria Cross.

The division was committed to the Allied offensive in the Somme area in late July. Positions adjacent to the village of Guillemont were occupied on the 30th; in the process of relieving a battalion east of Trônes Wood, the 1/8th sustained 18 casualties. Guillemont, where other battalions of the King's Regiment had fought with resultingly high casualties, was the 1/8th's second major battle, on 8 August. The five-day tour that preceded it was expensive, with about 50 casualties being incurred and an intense skirmish occurring on the 2nd. In the subsequent battle, the battalion was directed to attack on the right of the 1/4th Royal Lancasters and establish itself on the northern boundary of Guillemont, extending as far as the village's railway station. The battle commenced at 4:20am, upon which time the artillery bombardment ceased. While the 1/4th King's Own encountered dense barbed wire, the Liverpool Irish, attacking in conditions severely limiting visibility, penetrated the frontline and continued to advance rapidly. Progress had been so sudden that the first-line trenches remained uncleared of German troops. The supporting 1/4th Loyals withdrew from the German trenches as a consequence. Although 1st King's had entered Guillemont as well, the 1/8th was effectively unsupported after the Loyals withdrew. The battalion and its regular counterpart became isolated and surrounded. Casualties for the Liverpool Irish exceeded 550: five officers and ten other ranks (OR) had been confirmed killed; eight officers and 47 ORs were wounded and 502 missing. The battle for Guillemont was renewed the following night but the village was not captured until September.

==== 1917–1919 ====
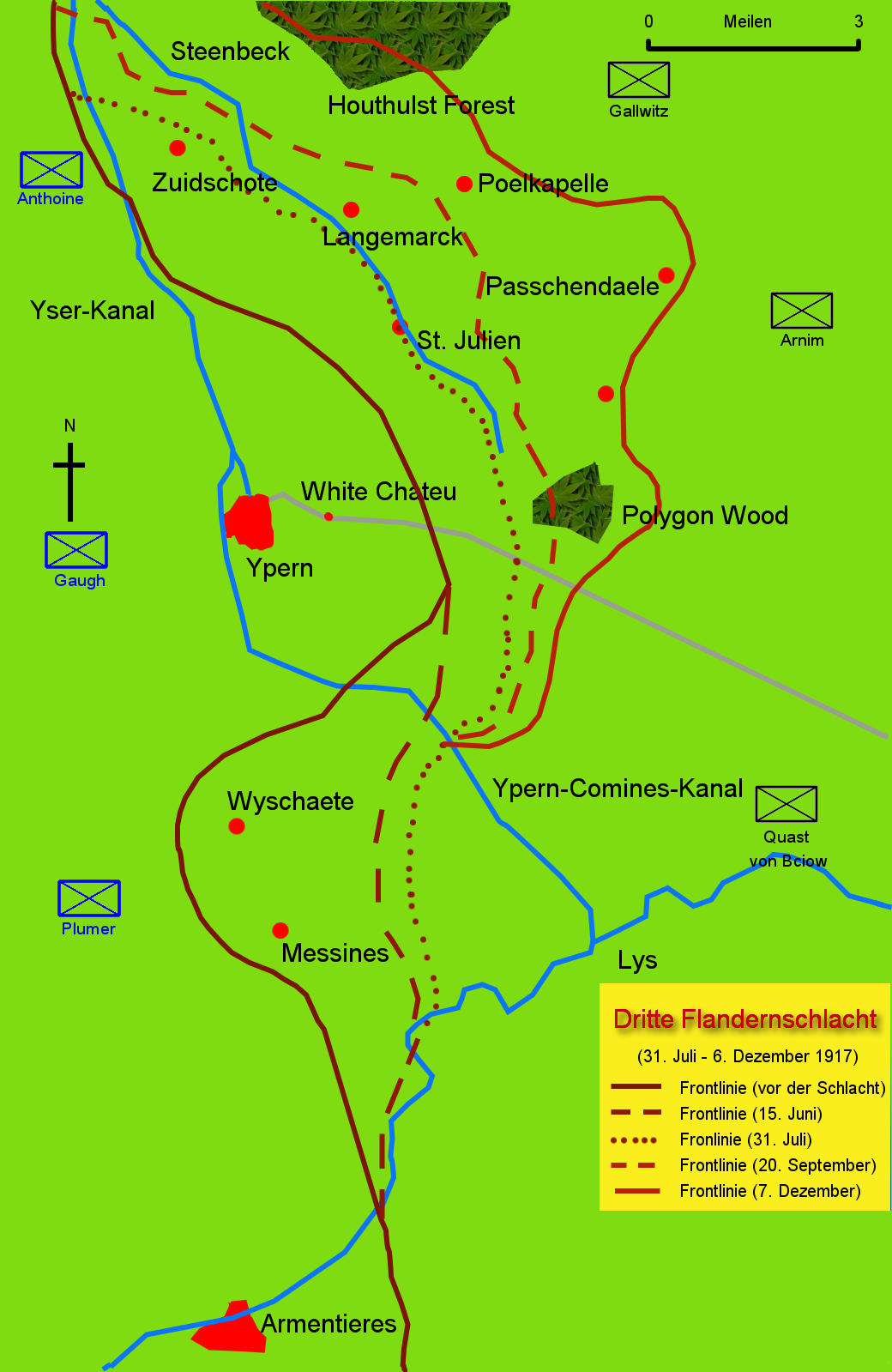
Map detailing the progression of the Third Battle of Ypres (31 July–10 November 1917.

The 55th Division transferred to the Ypres Salient in October. Duties typical to trench warfare occupied the Liverpool Irish in a sector described as "quiet" before the beginning of the Third Battle of Ypres on 31 July 1917. Patrols and raids were occasionally undertaken by the battalion. On 5 June, the 1/8th executed a retaliatory attack on German trenches following a raid on the battalion that left two soldiers unaccounted for. The 2/8th Battalion arrived in February and began its first tour at the front in March, in the La Bouteillerie sector. On the eve of the Third Battle of Ypres, the 55th Division was concentrated near Wieltje, east of the aforementioned town. Conditions in the Ypres sector rapidly deteriorated due to the weather's volatility before the battle and the onset of sustained rains from 31 July, creating a quagmire of mud and shellholes that epitomised the offensive that became known to the Allies as Passchendaele.

On the first-day of Third Ypres, in which 12 Allied divisions were engaged, it was intended that the Liverpool Irish would initially act as "moppers-up", entrusted with the responsibility of neutralising opposition on the front of the 2/5th Battalion, Lancashire Fusiliers, before partial dispersal to other battalions and employment as brigade support concentrated on a line between two positions known as Keir Farm and Schuler Farm, east of the village of St. Julien. The two battalions formed the left of the 164th Brigade, which was to secure the 55th Division's third objective – the Green Line (Gheluvelt-Langemarck Line) – after the capture of the Blue and Black lines by the 165th and 166th. Losses were sustained early in the advance from the battalion's trenches and steadily increased once beyond the Black Line. Various concrete emplacements and fortified positions littered the battleground, representing a constant threat with the heavy fire they directed at the brigade. Some were seized by the "moppers up", at one stage the 8th's "D" Company took upwards to 150 prisoners. By 12:30pm, part of the Liverpool Irish had established itself on the Green Line to reinforce the severely depleted Lancashire Fusiliers in the proximity of Fokker Farm and Wurst Farm. The majority of the 1/8th concentrated near Schuler Farm. For almost two-hours, the newly captured territory was subject to sustained bombardment by German artillery as a precursor to a concerted counter-attack against the Green Line, control of which was made more precarious by the exposure of the 164th's left flank. Unable to rectify the distance between it and the 118th Brigade, the contingent near Schuler Farm organised a fighting retreat with those who had withdrawn from the advanced positions back to the relative security of the Black Line. The remnants of the 1/8th, approximately 163 in strength, were ordered to retire to their starting positions under the command of Captain Monks. Among the dead was the battalion's field commander Major Harry Leech, who was killed along with six officers and 27 other ranks; 200 had been wounded and 88 were believed missing.

Severe manpower shortages necessitated extensive restructuring in early 1918 with the intent of alleviating the problem of understrength divisions. The reorganisation involved the amalgamation or disbandment of numerous battalions, including the first and second lines of the Liverpool Irish. The majority of the 1/8th's strength was dispersed to the King's battalions of the 165th Brigade; the 1/5th, 1/6th (Liverpool Rifles), and 1/7th. Those retained were integrated with the second-line, located near Pont-de-Nieme. The Liverpool Irish reverted to its prefix-less designation under the command of Lieutenant-Colonel Edward C. Heath, formerly of the 1/8th. Containing 52 officers and 927 other ranks, the consolidated 8th Battalion was assigned to the 171st Brigade and first entered the trenches in the L'Epinette sector in early February. The 57th Division was not involved in the Allied defence against the German spring offensive on the Somme in March and subsequent campaigns that gained Germany considerable territory, placing the French capital under threat and enabling its bombardment by the "Paris Gun". Entrenched near Gommecourt and Foncquevillers between April and July, the 57th Division received frequent guidance and orders described as "Defence Schemes".

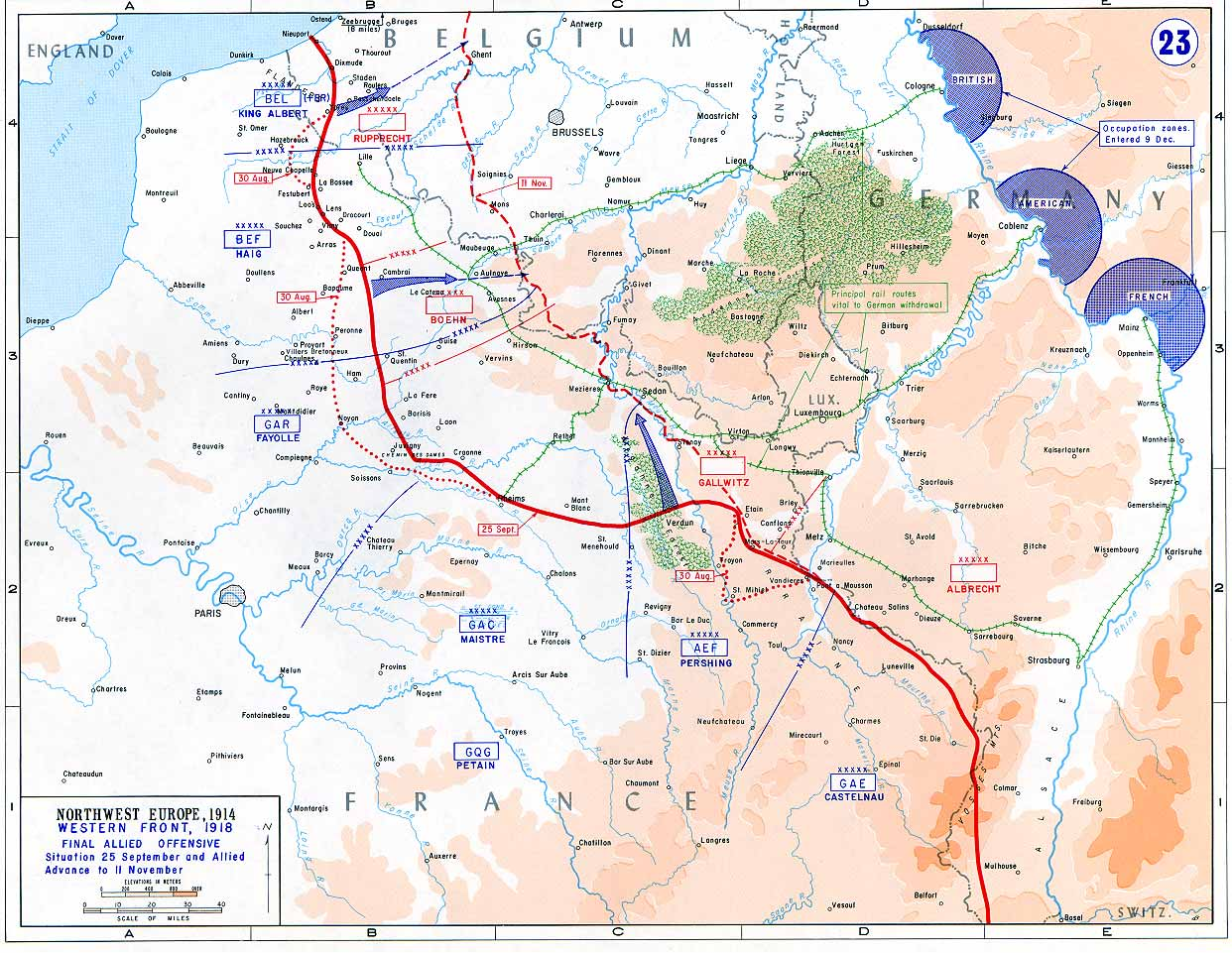
Progress of the Hundred Days' Offensive between 30 August and 11 November.

The succession of offensives exhausted the German military and resulted in casualties for it and the Allies accumulating to number in the millions. A counter-offensive initiated on 18 July forced a German withdrawal. On 8 August, Field Marshal Douglas Haig authorised the beginning of a series of ultimately decisive battles that became collectively known as the "Hundred Days". Positioned south-east of Arras, the Liverpool Irish was committed to battle on 1 September with the object of supporting the 2/6th King's in capturing the previously assaulted village of Riencourt and "straightening out the line". The battalion's brigade achieved its objectives, taking 650 prisoners in the process. Momentum was maintained into late September and October with the breaching of the Hindenburg Line. The battalion participated in the 57th Division's advance east and contribution to the capture of Cambrai, albeit in a limited capacity, before being moved north to the Béthune district on 13 October. The final weeks of the 57th Division's war involved sustained advances and sporadic fighting, culminating in the liberation of Lille. Abandoned by the retreating German garrison, Lille was first entered by elements of 2/7th King's on 17 October. Cameras recorded rapturous crowds greeting the Liverpool Irish and other battalions for a newsreel entitled The Deliverance of Lille by Haig's Men. The battalion conducted its final offensive action in the vanguard of its brigade, arriving at Flers unopposed and continuing to lead the advance until the 21st. Minor engagements had occurred near the villages of Honnevain, Mont Garni, and Froyennes. Nine days later, on the 30th, the Liverpool Irish withdrew to billets in Hellemmes, east of Lille, and remained there until the end of the war.

Hostilities ceased after the signing of the Armistice of 11 November 1918. The Liverpool Irish noted the cessation in the battalion war diary with the entry "Armistice signed". Almost four years of service on the Western Front had cost the Liverpool Irish in casualties. Losses during the period of attachment to the 55th Division alone amounted to 475 officers and men dead; 1,575 wounded; and 410 missing. Two soldiers from the battalion were executed during the war: Privates Joseph Brennan and Bernard McGeehan, both charged with desertion.

=== Interwar years ===
Demobilisation of the British Army commenced after the Armistice. The 8th (Irish) Battalion was initially reduced to a small cadre before being formally disembodied on 14 June 1919. In the early 1920s, the British Armed Forces further contracted after the imposition of the "Ten Year Rule" and enactment of many of the recommendations proposed by the Geddes Committee, which sought to reduce national expenditure – a process that became known as the "Geddes Axe". Within the British Army, a total of eight cavalry regiments and 22 infantry battalions ceased to exist. The Liverpool Irish was disbanded on 31 March 1922.

=== Second World War ===
The Territorial Army was expanded in March 1939 and the Liverpool Irish resultingly reformed as a duplicate of the 5th Battalion King's Regiment, with headquarters at the Embassy Rooms, Mount Pleasant. Recruitment commenced in May under the supervision of the battalion's first commanding officer, Lieutenant Colonel Ernest Michael Murphy. (Note: Murphy, a chemist who had served with the Liverpool Irish during the Great War, was killed in 1941, during the Liverpool Blitz. CWGC entry.) and officially came into existence in October. Upon Murphy's retirement in 1940, Lieutenant Colonel William Henry Hynes transferred from the Royal Inniskilling Fusiliers and assumed command. The battalion was assigned to the 198th Infantry Brigade, alongside the 6th and 7th Border Regiment. The brigade was assigned to the 66th Infantry Division until late June 1940 when it was disbanded and later assigned to the 1st London Infantry Division until December, and finally to the 54th (East Anglian) Infantry Division. For three years, the battalion trained and was assigned various duties across Britain, initially in Morecambe and Yorkshire. As the Allies made plans to invade occupied France in 1943, the Liverpool Irish was selected to form the nucleus of the 7th Beach Group. The group's objectives on an invasion beach were to maintain organisation, secure positions, and provide defence against counter-attack. Extensive specialist training occurred in Ayrshire and other parts of Britain under the command of Lieutenant Colonel W.J. Humphrey.

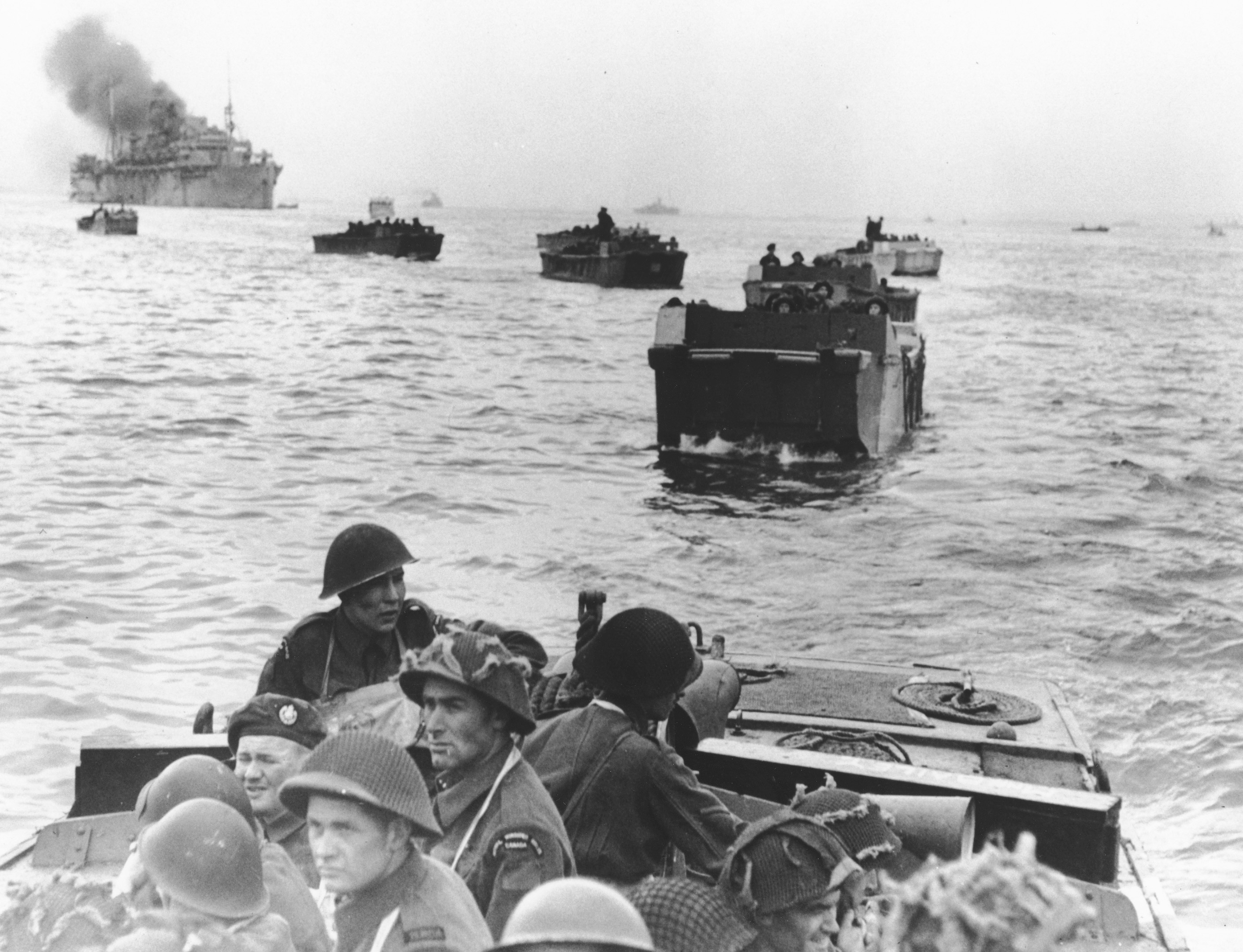
LCAs approaching Juno Beach.

On 30 May 1944, the Liverpool Irish moved from its camp in southern England to the port of Southampton, where the 8th embarked aboard troopships and landing ship tanks in early June. Elements of the Liverpool Irish embarked aboard the Ulster Monarch, formerly a passenger ship on the Belfast-Liverpool line. After a delay of 24 hours, the invasion fleet proceeded to Normandy on 5 June. The 7th Beach Group landed at Juno Beach with the 3rd Canadian Infantry Division on 6 June 1944, D-Day.

Two companies of the Liverpool Irish were assigned to the "Mike Green" and "Mike Red" areas, at Graye-sur-Mer, where the Royal Winnipeg Rifles incurred significant casualties. Under intense machine-gun and mortar fire, the landing of Major E.M. Morrison's "A" Company proceeded well and a command-post was established after reaching the sand dunes. In "B" Company's area, the late arrival of the reconnaissance party and DD tanks exposed the landing infantry to machine-gun fire. The company's officer commanding, Major O'Brien, and the second-in-command were among those who were wounded. While under fire, the beach group collected the wounded and dead, located and marked minefields, attempted to maintain organisation, and directed vehicles and troops inland.

On 7 June, a bomb released by a lone Luftwaffe fighter exploded amongst the anti-tank platoon, killing 15 and badly wounding seven. Employment with the beach group continued for a further six weeks. A notification was received on 14 July, via a letter written by General Bernard Montgomery, that personnel from the Liverpool Irish would be dispersed to other battalions as replacements. Depleted by losses and the transfer of soldiers, the battalion was placed in a state of "suspended animation" from 31 August and disappeared by 22 November.

=== Post Second World War ===
When the Territorial Army was reconstituted on 1 January 1947, the Liverpool Irish reformed as 626 (Liverpool Irish) Heavy Anti-Aircraft Regiment in the Royal Artillery. It formed part of the Liverpool-based 96th Army Group Royal Artillery (Anti-Aircraft) alongside 653 (Liverpool Welsh) HAA Rgt.

When Anti-Aircraft Command was disbanded on 10 March 1955 there were wholescale amalgamations among AA units. 626 HAA Regiment merged with two other units and was reduced to "Q" Battery in 470 (3rd West Lancashire) Light Anti-Aircraft Regiment. When the TA was reduced into the Territorial and Army Volunteer Reserve in 1967 the remaining artillery regiments in Lancashire were consolidated into 103rd (Lancashire Artillery Volunteers) Regiment, the South Lancashire Territorials, and the West Lancashire Regiment. The Liverpool Irish became A (Liverpool Irish) Troop, within 208 (3rd West Lancashire) Battery, 103 Regiment.

Personnel from the 103rd have been deployed on active operations in Northern Ireland, Bosnia, Kosovo, Afghanistan and Iraq.

== Uniforms and insignia ==
The original uniform of the Liverpool Irish was green with scarlet facings, changing to green facings in 1904.

On conversion to Royal Artillery in 1947, officers and warrant officers wore Rifle green caubeens and other ranks wore Irish infantry bonnets. All ranks continued to wear the 8th Battalion badge on an emerald green backing with the hackle in RA colours of red and blue. They also wore green lanyards in place of the Gunners' traditional white. As Q (Liverpool Irish) Battery these dress distinctions were continued, together with the pipe band, though the cap badge was eventually replaced by that of the RA.

As part of 96 AGRA (AA), 626 HAA Rgt wore a formation sign consisting of the tower of the Royal Liver Building in yellow, with wavy yellow lines below representing the River Mersey, all on the red-over-blue rectangle of the Royal Artillery.

A (Liverpool Irish) Troop of 103 Regiment retains the distinction of wearing the caubeen.
