= 171st (2/1st Liverpool) Brigade =

- Active: November 1914–July 1919; November 1943–April 1944
- Country: United Kingdom
- Branch: British Army
- Type: Infantry Brigade
- Role: Infantry and deception
- Part of: 57th (2nd West Lancashire) Division

171st (2/1st Liverpool) Brigade was a 2nd-Line infantry formation of the British Territorial Force raised during the First World War that served on the Western Front. The brigade's number was also used for deception purposes during the Second World War.

== Origin ==
On 31 August 1914 the War Office authorised the formation of a reserve or 2nd-Line unit for each Territorial Force (TF) unit that was proceeding on overseas service. The 2nd/1st Liverpool Brigade came into existence in November 1914, composed of 2nd-Line duplicates of the battalions of the peacetime Liverpool Brigade that were due to be sent overseas. The brigade was part of 2nd West Lancashire Division. In August 1915 these formations were assigned numbers, becoming 171st (2nd/1st Liverpool) Brigade and 57th (2nd West Lancashire) Division respectively.

== Order of battle ==
The following units served in the brigade during the war:

- 2/5th (Territorial Rifles) Battalion King's Regiment (Liverpool) – broken up 1 February 1918 and distributed among 2/6th, 2/7th, 11th and 12th King's
- 2/6th (Liverpool Rifles) Battalion King's Regiment (Liverpool)
- 2/7th Battalion King's Regiment (Liverpool)
- 2/8th (Liverpool Irish) Battalion King's Regiment (Liverpool) – amalgamated on 31 January 1918 with 1/8th King's from 164th (North Lancashire) Brigade and redesignated 8th King's
- 171st Machine Gun Company – joined February 1917; transferred to 57th Bn Machine Gun Corps 1 March 1918
- 171st Trench Mortar Battery – joined February 1917

== Commanders ==
The following officers commanded the brigade during the war:

- Col. S.H. Harrison (from 4 November 1914; transferred to 2nd North Lancashire Brigade April 1915)
- Brig.-Gen. A.R. Gilbert (transferred from Liverpool Brigade April 1915)
- Brig.-Gen. H.N. Bray (from 7 April 1917; injured 21 September 1917)
- Lt.-Col. O.H. North (acting)
- Brig.-Gen. F.C. Longbourne (from 23 September 1917; wounded 5 October 1918)
- Lt.-Col. Hon. N.C. Gathorne-Hardy (acting)
- Brig.-Gen. G. Meynell (from 11 October 1918)

== History ==
The formations and units of 57th Division concentrated around Canterbury in early 1915 as part of Second Army, Central Force. Training was hampered by lack of equipment: the infantry trained on obsolete .256-inch Japanese rifles until .303-inch service rifles (many in poor condition) arrived in November 1915. In July 1916, 57th Division was transferred to the Emergency Reserves in the Aldershot area where it continued training.

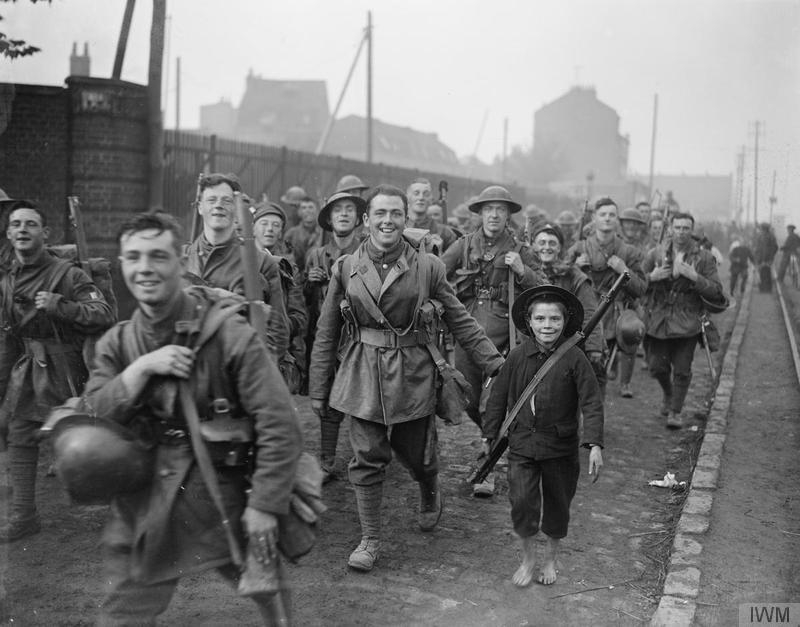
Men of the 8th (Liverpool Irish) Battalion of the King's (Liverpool Regiment) entering Lille, France, 18 October 1918. Note a barefooted French boy with a rifle, clearly given to him by a smiling British soldier on his right.

On 5 January 1917 the division was ready for overseas service, and between 7 and 22 February its units and formations crossed to France and disembarked at Le Havre. On 25 February it took over a section of the Front Line under the command of II ANZAC Corps. 171 Brigade served on the Western Front for the rest of the war, taking part in the following operations:

- Second Battle of Passchendaele 26 October–7 November 1917
- Second Battle of Arras:
  - Battle of the Scarpe 28–30 August 1918
  - Battle of Drocourt-Queant Line 2–3 September 1918
- Battles of the Hindenburg Line:
  - Battle of the Canal du Nord 27 September–1 October 1918
  - Battle of Cambrai 8–9 October 1918
  - Capture of Cambrai 9 October 1918
- Final Advance in Artois and Flanders 15 October–1 November 1918
  - Occupation of Lille 17 October 1918

On 1 November 1918 171 Brigade went into billets at Lille, and was still resting when the Armistice of 11 November 1918 was signed. For the rest of 1918 its units were involved in clearing and evacuating stores from the Arras area. Demobilisation began in January 1919 and units were steadily reduced to cadres. The last cadres of 57th Division left France in July 1919, completing the disbandment of 171 Brigade.

== Second World War ==
171 Brigade was never reformed, but the number was used for deception purposes during the Second World War. 31st Battalion Suffolk Regiment, a line of communication unit serving in 42nd Brigade in North Africa and composed mainly of men below Medical Category 'A', was redesignated '171st Infantry Brigade' and acted as if it were a full brigade from November 1943 until June 1944.

== External sources ==
- The Long, Long Trail
- The Regimental Warpath 1914–1918
