= Liverpool Rifles =

Liverpool Rifles 6th Bn (Rifles) King's Regiment 38th (King's) Searchlight Regiment, RA 635 (King's Regiment) Regiment, RA 573 (King's Regiment) HAA Regiment, RA
- Active: From 19 August 1859
- Country: United Kingdom
- Branch: Territorial Force
- Role: Infantry, searchlight, artillery
- Part of: King's Regiment (Liverpool)
- Garrison/HQ: Princes Park Barracks, Liverpool
- Engagements: Western Front; The Blitz; Operation Diver; Operation Doomsday
- Battle honours: South Africa 1900–01

The Liverpool Rifles was a unit of the Territorial Army, part of the British Army, formed in Lancashire as a 'Rifle Volunteer Corps' (RVC) in 1859, becoming a battalion of the King's Regiment (Liverpool) in 1881. It saw action on the Western Front in the First World War and later became a searchlight unit of the Royal Artillery in the Second World War.

== Origins ==
Gladstone was a leading figure in the Volunteer Movement at that time, serving on the War Office committee that drew up rules for RVCs in August 1859, and on the founding committee of the National Rifle Association in October that year. In 1860, he leased land from Lord Sefton to create the Altcar Rifle Range. Gladstone died in 1863.

As the number of RVCs grew rapidly during 1860, the smaller company-sized units were grouped into Administrative Battalions. The 5th Lancashire RVC was the senior unit included in the Liverpool-based 2nd Administrative Battalion Lancashire Rifle Volunteers when it was formed in May 1860 (dates are of first commissions issued):

- 5th (Liverpool Volunteer Rifle Brigade) Lancashire RVC, 19 August 1859
- 14th (2nd Southport) Lancashire RVC, 16 February 1860 – joined 13th (1st Southport) in 1st Admin Bn in 1862
- 19th (Liverpool Lowland Scottish) Lancashire RVC, 18 January 1860
- 39th (Liverpool Welsh) Lancashire RVC, 9 February 1860 – comprised clerks and book keepers raised under the auspices of the Welsh Literary Society; instituted an instalment plan to help the less well-off members to pay their subscriptions; elected their officers
- 63rd (Toxteth) Lancashire RVC, 9 April 1860
- 64th (Liverpool Irish) Lancashire RVC, 25 April 1860
- 68th (Lyceum Corps) Lancashire RVC, 31 May 1860
- 71st (Liverpool Highlanders) Lancashire RVC, 24 May 1860
- 81st (Withnell) Lancashire RVC, 20 February 1861 – to 8th Admin Bn in 1862
- 86th (Liverpool) Lancashire RVC, 18 May 1861

In March 1862, the 2nd Admin Battalion was consolidated as a single unit under the title of its senior subunit, the 5th (Liverpool Rifle Brigade) RVC. Two new companies joined at this time:

- 32nd (Liverpool) Lancashire RVC, first commissions 28 January 1860
- 79th (Liverpool) Lancashire RVC, 16 February 1861

However, the Liverpool Irish became an independent battalion, while the Liverpool Highlanders also remained independent but were disbanded in 1863. The individual character of the companies was lost in the reorganisation, but a new Liverpool Scottish battalion reformed in 1900, and the 46th (Liverpool Welsh) Royal Tank Regiment was formed in 1939.

The 5th Lancashire RVC became a volunteer battalion of the King's Regiment (Liverpool) as part of the Childers Reforms in 1881 (and was designated as the 2nd Volunteer Battalion from 1888). By that time Robert Tilney was the commanding officer, with the rank of lieutenant-colonel, when he was awarded a CB. He died in 1882. Volunteers served in the Second Boer War, gaining the battalion its first Battle Honour: South Africa 1900–1901.

== Territorial Force ==
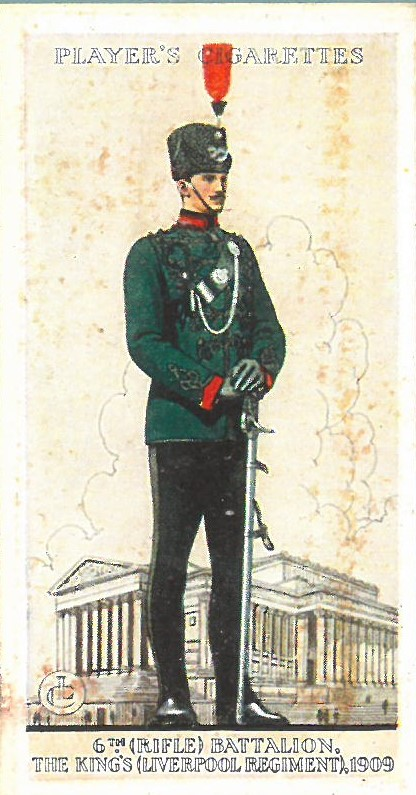
Player's cigarette card showing an officer of the Liverpool Rifles in full dress uniform, which became the 6th (Rifle) Battalion, The King's (Liverpool Regiment) in 1908.

When the Volunteer Force was subsumed into the new Territorial Force (TF) under the Haldane Reforms in 1908, the 2nd Volunteer Battalion became the 6th Battalion (Rifles) King's Regiment (Liverpool), with its HQ and A to H Companies at Princes Park Barracks, Upper Warwick Street, Liverpool. It formed part of the Liverpool Brigade in the West Lancashire Division of the TF.

== First World War ==
When war broke out in August 1914, the Territorial Force had just begun its annual training camps. The 6th Battalion, Kings Regiment immediately returned to Prince's Park Barracks to mobilise. However, the West Lancashire Division did not go to war as a single formation: its infantry battalions volunteered for Foreign Service and went to the Western Front separately as reinforcements for the British Expeditionary Force. These were termed First Line battalions, while Home Service men, recruits and the unfit were transferred to Second Line battalions: the 2/6th King's was formed at Liverpool on 10 September 1914. Later the 2/6th King's was brought up to war readiness in the 2nd Liverpool Brigade of 2nd West Lancashire Division and a Third Line battalion (3/6th) was formed as reserve to provide drafts to the 1/6th and 2/6th.

=== 1/6th (Rifle) Battalion ===
The battalion moved to Canterbury, Kent in the autumn of 1914. In February 1915 it was sent to France, disembarking at Le Havre on 25 February 1915 and joining 15th Brigade in the Regular 5th Division. Soon after the battalion's arrival, 15th Brigade was temporarily transferred to the Regular 28th Division, but returned to the 5th in time for the fighting around Ypres in April 1915.

The 1/6th's first major engagement occurred on 5 May, in a German attack on Hill 60 during the Second Battle of Ypres. Control of Hill 60 had briefly fluctuated after its capture in a British attack on 17 April, but fighting ended with the British in possession. Poison gas was used during the preliminary German attack, facilitating the assault against positions held by the 2nd Duke of Wellington's Regiment. After Hill 60 was lost, companies from the Liverpool Rifles were used successively in support of the 1st Battalion, Cheshire Regiment; "C" Company, heavily engaged, suffered 60 casualties. The Liverpool Rifles collectively sustained nearly 100 casualties between the period of 5 May-6 May, 22 of whom were killed. German control of Hill 60 was consolidated by 7 May.

In November, the Liverpool Rifles left the 5th Division to become Third Army Troops. By now, the Army Council had decided to reform the West Lancashire Territorial Division in France as the 55th (West Lancashire) Division. 1/6th King's rejoined the Liverpool Brigade (now numbered as the 165th (Liverpool) Brigade on 26 January 1916.

1/6th King's served on the Western Front for the remainder of the war, participating in the following actions:

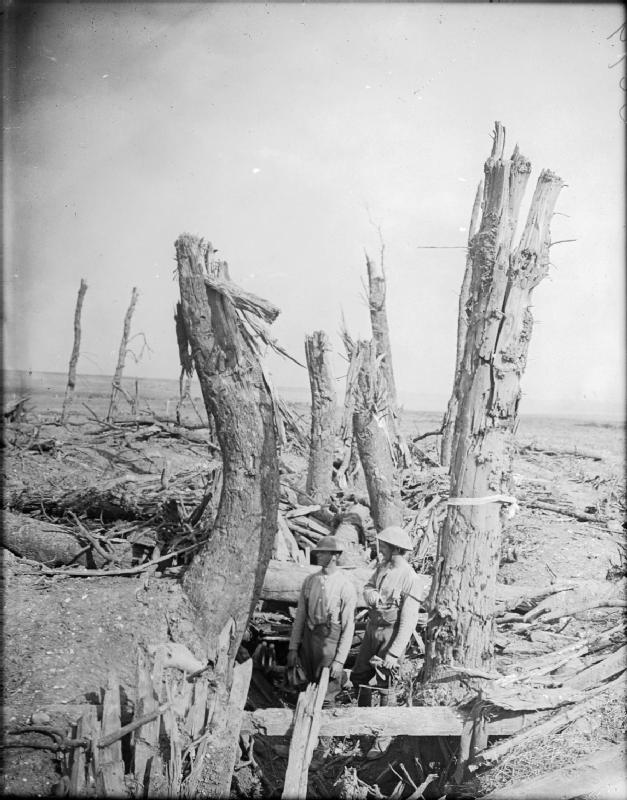
British soldiers in a wrecked German trench at Ginchy, 1916.

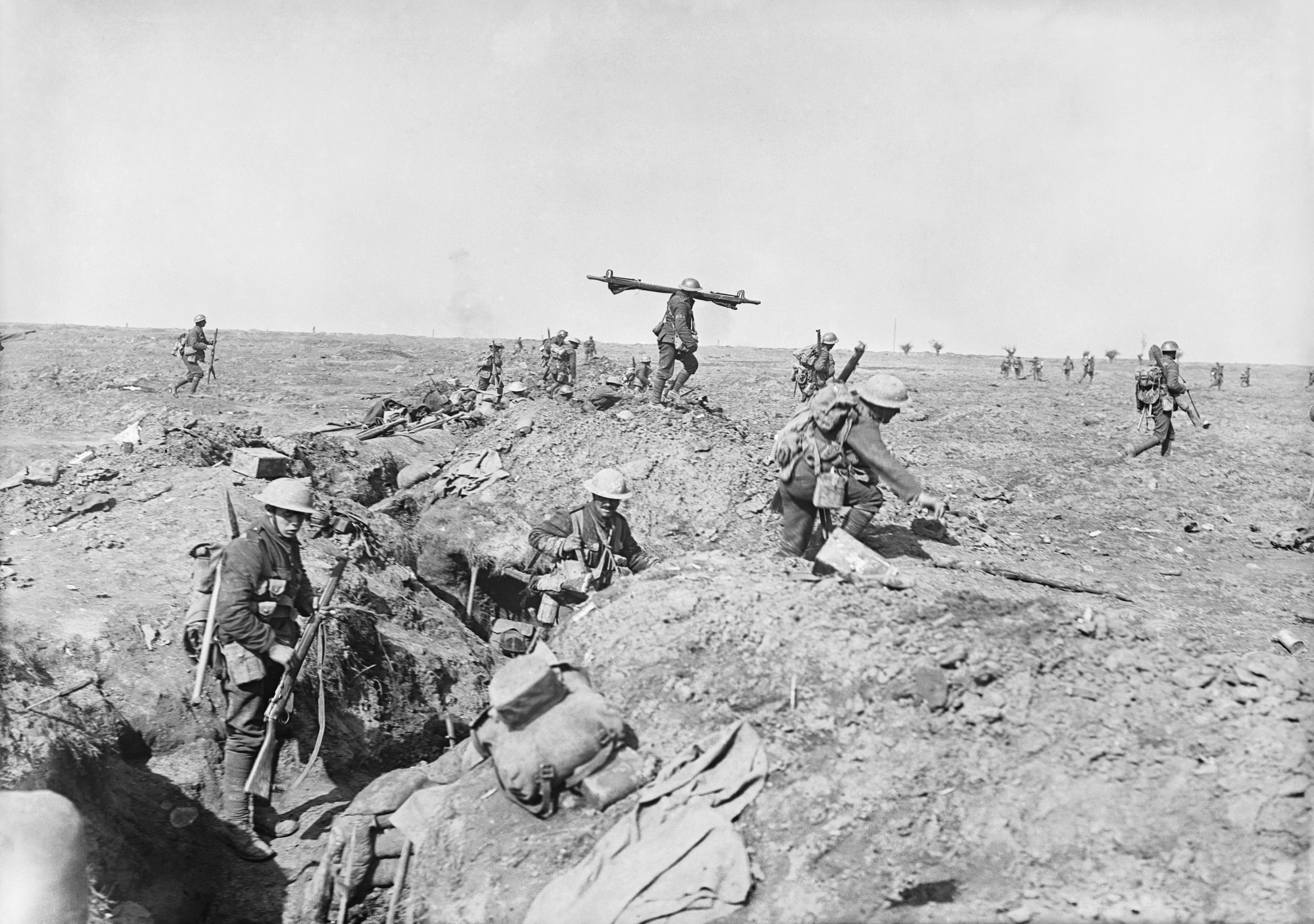
British infantry at Morval, 25 September 1916.

1916

- Battle of the Somme
  - Battle of Guillemont, 4–6 September
  - Battle of Ginchy, 9 September
  - Battle of Flers–Courcelette, 17–22 September
  - Battle of Morval, 25–28 September

1917

- Third Battle of Ypres
  - Battle of Pilckem Ridge, 31 July–2 August
  - Battle of the Menin Road Ridge, 20–23 September
- Battle of Cambrai
  - The Tank Attack, 20–21 November
  - German Counter-Attacks, 30 November–3 December

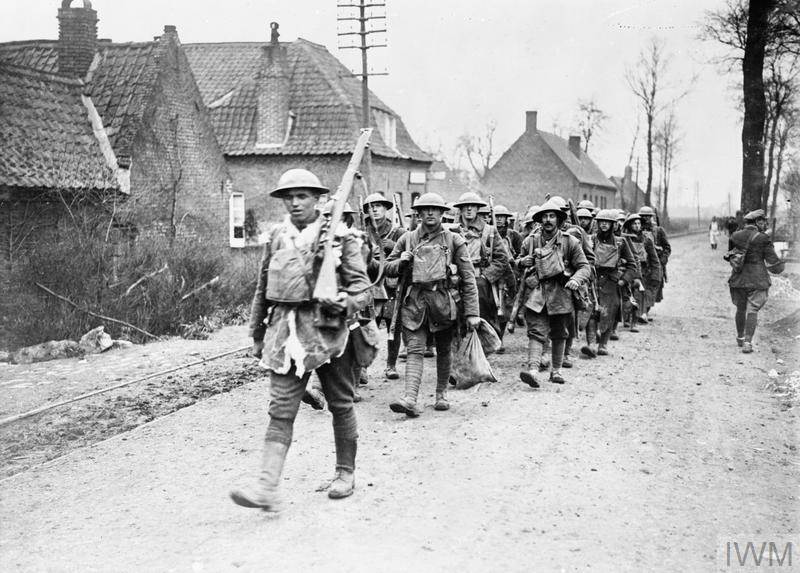
Men of 55th (WL) Division marching through Béthune after the defence of Givenchy, April 1918.

1918

- Battle of the Lys
  - Battle of Estaires, 9–11 April
  - Defence of Givenchy, 9–17 April
  - Battle of Hazebrouck, 12–15 April
- Advance to Victory
  - Capture of Givenchy Craters, 24 August
  - Capture of Cateleux Trench, 17 September (by the Liverpool Brigade)

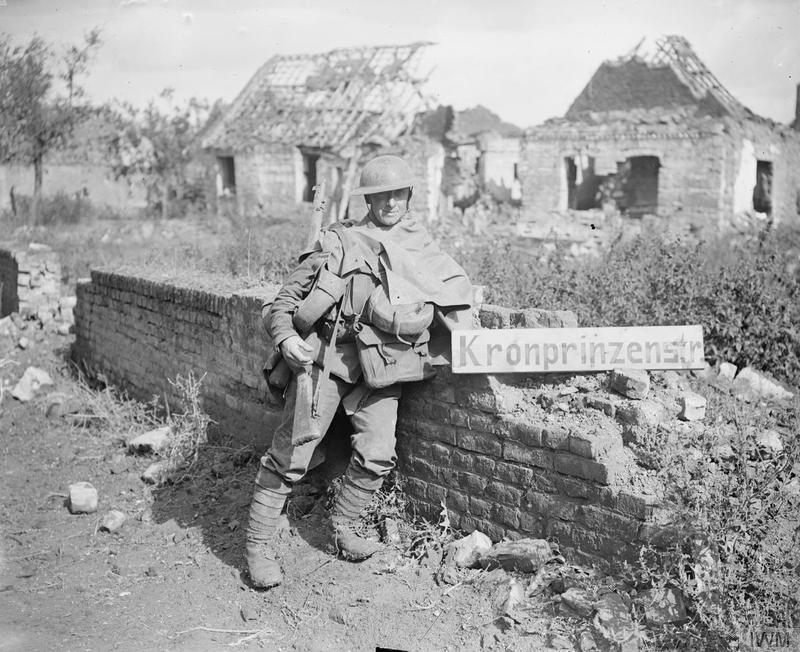
A soldier of the 6th Battalion, King's Regiment, and a German signboard "Kronprinzenstr." Inchy, 13 September 1918.

On 2 October 1918, the Germans started to withdraw on 55th Division's front and the troops pushed forward and occupied La Bassée the same day. They forced the line of the Haute Deule Canal on 14–16 October and captured Ath early on 11 November. When the Armistice with Germany came into force at 11.00 on 11 November, the division had reached a line seven miles east of Ath.

On 15 November, the division was ordered to advance into Germany as part of the occupation forces, but this was cancelled on 21 November, and the division was chiefly employed on railway reconstruction and road repair. By 18 December, the division had moved to Brussels. Demobilisation proceeded during January 1919 and the division had dwindled to small numbers by the end of April 1919 as men went home. The battalion was disembodied on 16 June 1919.

=== 2/6th (Rifle) Battalion ===
The 2/6th Battalion was formed on 10 September 1914 at Liverpool The 2nd West Lancashire Division assembled around Canterbury, with 2/6th Battalion at Margate from 15 March 1915 and at Upstreet Camp on 13 July 1915 The division was numbered 57th (2nd West Lancashire) Division in August 1915, the 2/6th King's forming part of 171st (2/1st Liverpool) Brigade. At first the battalion only had .256-in Japanese Ariska rifles with which to train. In late November, they received .303 Le-Enfield rifles; although many of these were in poor condition, the Japanese rifles could now be returned to store. Towards the end of February 1916, the battalion received its Lewis guns.

In July 1916, the 57th Division moved to Aldershot Command for final training, with 2/6th Battalion at Bourley, and then at Inkerman Barracks, Woking, from 27 September 1916. On 14 February 1917 the 2/6th King's landed at Boulogne. It went into the line on 25 February and served on the Western Front for the remainder of the war, participating in the following actions:

1917

- Second Battle of Passchendaele, 26 October–7 November

1918

- Second Battle of Arras
  - Battle of the Scarpe, 28–30 August
  - Battle of Drocourt-Quéant Line, 2–3 September
- Battle of the Hindenburg Line
  - Battle of the Canal du Nord, 27 September–1 October
  - Battle of Cambrai, 8–9 October
  - Capture of Cambrai, 9 October
- Final Advance in Artois and Flanders
  - Occupation of Lille, 17 October

On 1 November 1918, 57th Division was relieved in the front line and went into billets. It was still resting when hostilities ended on 11 November. After the Armistice, the troops were engaged in collecting and evacuating stores in the Arras area. Demobilisation began in January 1919 and by March the units had been reduced to cadres, the last of which left for England on 25 June. The battalion was disbanded on 20 May 1919 at Landguard Common.

=== 3/6th Battalion ===
The 3/6th King's was formed in Liverpool in May 1915 and moved to Blackpool in the autumn. Its role was to train drafts for the 1/6th and 2/6th battalions. In early 1916 it moved to Oswestry, and then in April it became the 6th (Reserve) Battalion, King's, in the West Lancashire Reserve Brigade. On 1 September 1916 6th (Reserve) Bn was absorbed into the 5th (Reserve) Bn.

=== 25th Battalion ===
The remaining Home Service men of the TF were separated when the 3rd Line battalions were raised in May 1915, and were formed into Provisional Battalions for home defence. The men of the 6th (Rifle) Bn joined with those from the 5th King's to form 43rd Provisional Battalion in the defences of East Anglia.

The Military Service Act 1916 swept away the Home/Foreign service distinction, and all TF soldiers became liable for overseas service. The Provisional Battalions thus became anomalous, and they became numbered battalions of their parent units. On 1 January 1917, 43rd Provisional Battalion became 25th King's. Part of the new role of the former provisional units was physical conditioning to render men fit for drafting overseas, and 25th Kings landed at Calais as a 'Garrison Guard' battalion in May 1918. It joined 59th (2nd North Midland) Division and dropped the 'Garrison Guard' title, becoming a fighting battalion. It saw action at the Battle of Albert (21–23 August) and the final advance in Artois and Flanders. 25th King's continued serving after the war, and was finally disbanded in Egypt on 28 March 1920.

== Interwar years ==
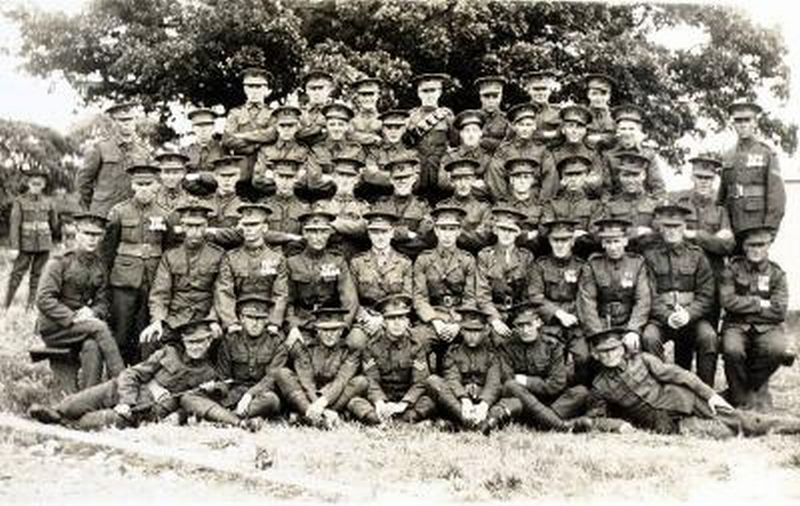
C Company of the 6th (Rifle) Battalion at Kinmel Park, near Rhyl, Wales. (July 1931).

The 6th (Rifle) Battalion, King's Regiment reformed in the TF (Territorial Army (TA) from 1921) on 7 February 1920. It was supposed to have amalgamated with the 5th Bn King's in 1922, but the order was rescinded. It became part of 165th (Liverpool) Brigade, part of the reformed 55th (West Lancashire) Division.

=== 38th (The King's Regiment) AA Battalion ===
In the 1930s, the increasing need for anti-aircraft (AA) defence for Britain's cities was met by converting TA infantry battalions to that role. On 10 December 1936 the 6th (Rifle) Battalion was converted into a searchlight unit of the Royal Engineers (RE) as 38th (The King's Regiment) Anti-Aircraft Battalion, RE (TA), with HQ, 351 and 352 AA Companies at The Drill Hall, Mather Ave, Liverpool, and 350 and 353 AA Companies at Princes Park Barracks. The unit was assigned to 33rd (Western) AA Group (later Brigade) in 2nd AA Division.

== Second World War ==
=== Mobilisation ===
90 cm Projector Anti-Aircraft, displayed at Fort Nelson, Hampshire.

The TA's AA units were mobilised on 23 September 1938 during the Munich Crisis, with units manning their emergency positions within 24 hours, even though many did not yet have their full complement of men or equipment. The emergency lasted three weeks, and they were stood down on 13 October. In February 1939 the existing AA defences came under the control of a new Anti-Aircraft Command. In June a partial mobilisation of TA units was begun in a process known as 'couverture', whereby each AA unit did a month's tour of duty in rotation to man selected AA and searchlight positions. On 24 August, ahead of the declaration of war, AA Command was fully mobilised at its war stations.

38th AA Battalion was still in 33rd AA Bde based at Woolton, Liverpool, but this was now part of 4th AA Division at Chester.

In August 1940, the RE AA Battalions were transferred to the Royal Artillery (RA) and the battalion was redesignated 38th (The Kings Regiment) Searchlight Regiment, RA (TA). The men continued to wear a 'Liverpool Rifles' shoulder title with red lettering on a Rifle green background.

=== Blitz and Orkney ===
The regiment served through the early part of The Blitz in the autumn of 1940. By now, the regiment was back in 2 AA Division, split between 32 AA Bde covering the East Midlands and 50th AA Bde based at Derby. Then, while 352 S/L Bty remained attached to 2nd AA Division, the rest of the regiment went to Orkney, where it joined 59th AA Bde in the Orkney and Shetland Defences (OSDEF), protecting the Home Fleet's base at Scapa Flow.

Meanwhile, in the Midlands, where 352 S/L Bty was deployed, the searchlight layout was reorganised in 1941, so that any hostile raid approaching the Gun Defended Areas (GDA) around the towns must cross more than one searchlight belt, and then within the GDAs the concentration of lights was increased. Increasing numbers of Searchlight Control (SLC) radar sets also became available.

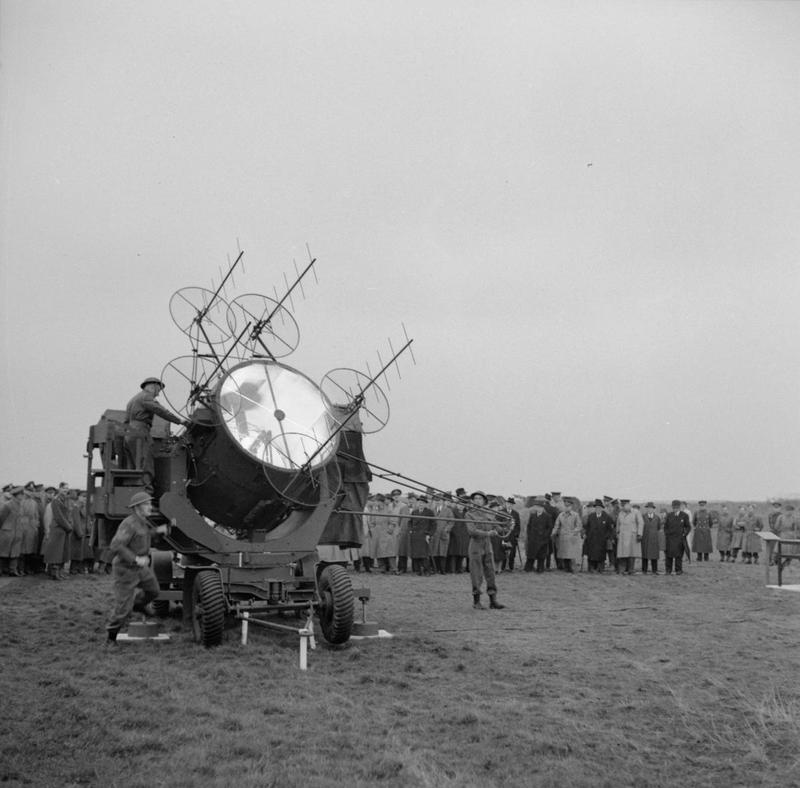
Demonstration of No 2 Mk VI SLC ('Elsie')

The regiment returned to the mainland UK by mid-November 1941 and was reunited with 352 S/L Bty in 68th AA Bde in 11th AA Division (later 4 AA Group) covering the West Midlands. It remained here for over two years.

=== Baby Blitz and Operation Diver ===
Intelligence indicated that the Germans could start launching V-1 flying bombs against London at any time from January 1944 onwards, and AA Command began bring S/L units south to thicken up the defences as part of Operation Diver. The regiment moved to join 27th AA Bde controlling S/Ls over South Eastern England for 2 AA Group. Between 21 January and 14 March 1944, the Luftwaffe carried out 11 conventional night raids on London in the so-called 'Baby Blitz'. These raids were met by intense AA fire and Royal Air Force night-fighters, which scored an impressive number of 'kills' in conjunction with radar-controlled S/Ls.

AA Command was now being forced to release manpower for the planned Allied invasion of Normandy (Operation Overlord), and all Home Defence searchlight regiments were reduced by one battery. 353 Battery commenced disbandment on 7 February 1944, completing by 28 February. AA Command also had the task of protecting the Overlord assembly areas and ports: in May and June 1944, while the build-up for Overlord was at its height, 38th S/L Rgt was transferred to the command of 38th AA Bde in 2 AA Group (covering the Thames Estuary), but returned a month later.

The beginning of the V-1 campaign against London came on 13 June, a week after Overlord was launched on D Day, and Operation Diver was put into effect. The S/L positions had been established at 3,000 yards (2,700 m) intervals to cooperate with RAF night-fighters, and each position also had a Bofors 40 mm light AA gun. After a poor start the guns and fighters began to gain a measure of control over the flying bombs, and by the end of the first phase of the operation, after 21st Army Group had overrun the launch sites in Northern France in September, 1,800 night fighter interceptions had been achieved, of which 142 were due to S/L illumination. In the autumn, the focus switched to East Anglia when the Luftwaffe began air-launching V-1s over the North Sea.

=== 635 (King's Regiment) Infantry Regiment ===
By January 1945, 21st Army Group fighting in North West Europe was suffering a severe manpower shortage, particularly among the infantry. At the same time, the German Luftwaffe was suffering from such shortages of pilots, aircraft and fuel that serious aerial attacks on the UK could be discounted. In January 1945, the War Office began to reorganise surplus AA units in the UK into infantry battalions, primarily for line of communication and occupation duties, thereby releasing trained infantry for frontline service. 27th AA Brigade was one formation chosen for this conversion, becoming 303 Brigade, in which 38th S/L Rgt became 635 (King's Regiment) Infantry Regiment RA on 23 January 1945.

After infantry training, including a short period attached to 61st Infantry Division, 303 Bde was sent to Norway in June 1945 following the liberation of that country (Operation Doomsday). 635 Regiment was placed in suspended animation at Colchester on 31 January 1946.

== Postwar ==
When the TA was reconstituted on 1 January 1947, 635 Regiment reformed as 573 (The King's Regiment) (Mixed) Heavy Anti-Aircraft Regiment RA (TA), based at Liverpool and attached to 79th Anti-Aircraft Brigade at Woolton. (The term 'Mixed' indicated that members of the Women's Royal Army Corps were integrated into the regiment.)

On 10 March 1955, Anti-Aircraft Command was disbanded, and 573 HAA Regiment was merged into 287 (1st West Lancashire) Medium Regiment, becoming Q (King's) Battery. After another regiment was absorbed the battery became R (King's) Battery on 31 October 1956. It was amalgamated into Q (1st West Lancashire) Battery on 1 May 1961.

573 HAA Regiment, and later R (King's) Battery of 287 Regiment, wore an arm badge of a black rose over a strung bugle horn on a red rectangle, based on the Liverpool Rifles cap badge.

In the 1967 reduction of the TA into the Territorial and Army Volunteer Reserve (TAVR), B Troop (The Liverpool Rifles) was formed from 287 Regiment in the new West Lancashire Regiment RA, but this in turn was reduced to a cadre in 1969 and absorbed into 208 (3rd West Lancashire Artillery) Battery of 103rd (Lancashire Artillery Volunteers) Regiment Royal Artillery in 1973. The regiment is currently B (King's) Troop, 208 (3rd West Lancashire) Battery, 103 Regiment RA.

== Honorary Colonel ==
- Lt-Col E.J. Harrison, TD, appointed 22 April 1922.

== Battle honours ==
- South Africa 1900–01

The battalion contributed to its parent regiment's honours during the First World War. The RE and RA do not carry battle honours, so none were received for the Second World War.
