= Edward Felix Baxter =

Recipient of the Victoria Cross and motorcyclist

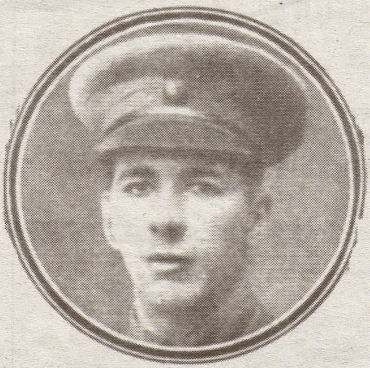
- Born: 18 September 1885; Oldswinford, Stourbridge, Worcestershire
- Died: 18 April 1916 (aged 30); Blairville, France
- Burial place: Fillievres British Cemetery, Pas de Calais, France
- Military career
- Allegiance: United Kingdom
- Branch: British Army
- Service years: 1914–1916
- Rank: Second Lieutenant
- Units: Royal Engineers; King's (Liverpool) Regiment
- Conflicts: First World War: Western Front †
- Awards: Victoria Cross
- Other work: Isle of Man TT rider

Edward Felix Baxter
Motorcycle racing career statistics
Isle of Man TT career
TTs contested	1 (1910)
TT wins	0
TT podiums	0

Second Lieutenant Edward Felix Baxter VC (18 September 1885 – 18 April 1916) was a British Army soldier and an English recipient of the Victoria Cross (VC), the highest and most prestigious award for gallantry in the face of the enemy that can be awarded to British and Commonwealth forces.

== Early life ==
Felix Baxter was born in Oldswinford near Stourbridge in Worcestershire, the son of Charles and Beatrice (née Sparrow). He worked as a tutor. He competed in the 1910 Isle of Man TT Races and crashed on lap 4 at Ballacraine. The resulting damage to the front forks of his motor-cycle caused his retirement from the race.

== First World War ==
Baxter was a second lieutenant in the 1/8th Battalion, The King's (Liverpool) Regiment, British Army during the First World War when the following deed took place for which he was awarded the VC. The citation appeared in a supplement to the London Gazette of 26 September 1916:

War Office, 26th September, 1916.

His Majesty the KING has been graciously pleased to award the Victoria Cross to the undermentioned Officers, Non-commissioned Officers and Men:—

[...]

2nd Lt. Edward Felix Baxter, late L'pool R.

For most conspicuous bravery. Prior to a raid on the hostile line he was engaged during two nights in cutting wire close to the enemy's trenches. The enemy could be heard on the other side of the parapet.

Second Lieutenant Baxter, while assisting in the wire cutting, held a bomb in his hand with the pin withdrawn ready to throw. On one occasion the bomb slipped and fell to the ground, but he instantly picked it up, unscrewed the base plug, and took out the detonator, which he smothered in the ground, thereby preventing the alarm being given, and undoubtedly saving many casualties.

Later, he led the left storming party with the greatest gallantry, and was the first man into the trench, shooting the sentry with his revolver. He then assisted to bomb dugouts, and finally climbed out of the trench and assisted the last man over the parapet.

After this he was not seen again, though search parties went out at once to look for him. There seems no doubt that he lost his life in his great devotion to duty.

He is buried at Row A, Grave 10, in the Fillievres British Cemetery, France, located 8 miles south west of Hesdin. His Victoria Cross is displayed in the Lord Ashcroft Gallery in the Imperial War Museum in London.

== Bibliography ==
- Gliddon, Gerald (2004) [2012]. VCs of the First World War: Cambrai 1917. The History Press. ISBN 978-0-75-247668-1.
