= Second Army (Home Forces) =

Second Army was a home service formation of the British Army during the First World War.

Second Army was formed on 5 August 1914 under the command of Central Force. It was based at Aldershot and Sir Frederick Stopford was the Army Commander. Units attached to the Army were the 1st London Division, the Home Counties Division and the South Eastern Mounted Brigade. By November 1914 Army HQ had moved to Tunbridge Wells.

Second Army kept its name even after the establishment of a Second Army in the British Expeditionary Force in December 1914. It was disbanded on 12 March 1916 and reformed as Southern Army.
