= 42nd Infantry Brigade (United Kingdom) =

Brigade of the British Army

42nd Brigade 42nd Infantry Brigade 42 (North West) Brigade
- Insignia of 42 (North West) Brigade.
- Active: 21 August 1914–24 March 1919; 26 July 1943–29 July 1944; 1982-January 2017
- Country: United Kingdom
- Branch: British Army
- Type: Regular and Territorial Army
- Part of: 14th (Light) Division; Allied Force Headquarters; UK Land Forces
- Garrison/HQ: Fulwood Barracks, Preston
- Engagements: Battle of the Somme; Battle of Arras; Third Battle of Ypres; German spring offensive Hundred Days Offensive

42nd Brigade (42nd Bde) was an infantry formation of the British Army during both World Wars. (Note: An unverifiable source apparently suggests that 42nd Brigade first saw action in the Second Boer War. This is unlikely: The Times History of the War in South Africa 1899–1902 and the Army Lists of the period show no brigades numbered higher than 23rd (see List of British Army formations during the Second Boer War). Volunteer Infantry Brigades (similar to the 1980s' regional HQs) existed in the Volunteer Force from 1888, but these were unnumbered, and did not see active service before World War I. On the formation of the Territorial Force in 1908 those in North West England were incorporated in the East and West Lancashire Divisions. When these received numbers in 1915 as the 42nd (East Lancashire) Division and 55th (West Lancashire) Division, the brigades were numbered from 125th upwards.) It was formed in August 1914 as part of Kitchener's Army, and was assigned to the 14th (Light) Division, serving on the Western Front. It was reformed in World War II for line of communication and deception purposes. As 42 (North West) Brigade it became a regional headquarters from 1982 to 2017.

== World War I ==
On 6 August 1914, less than 48 hours after Britain's declaration of war, Parliament sanctioned an increase of 500,000 men for the Regular British Army. The newly-appointed Secretary of State for War, Earl Kitchener of Khartoum, issued his famous call to arms: 'Your King and Country Need You', urging the first 100,000 volunteers to come forward. Men flooded into the recruiting offices and the 'first hundred thousand' were enlisted within days. Army Order No 324 of 21 August authorised six new infantry divisions to be formed from these recruits, which became known as Kitchener's First New Army, or 'K1'. The senior of these division was to be 8th (Light) Division composed of battalions drawn from light infantry and rifle regiments of the British Army, with three brigades numbered 23rd, 24th and 25th. This formation began assembling at Aldershot. However, it soon emerged that sufficient Regular Army battalions would be brought back from overseas garrisons to form an additional division: this became 8th Division, and the Kitchener division was renumbered on 14 September as the 14th (Light) Division, its brigades becoming 41st, 42nd and 43rd.

=== Order of Battle ===
The brigade was composed as follows:

- 5th (Service) Battalion, Oxfordshire and Buckinghamshire Light Infantry – left division 16 June 1918
- 5th (Service) Battalion, King's Shropshire Light Infantry – disbanded 3 February 1918
- 9th (Service) Battalion, King's Royal Rifle Corps – left division 16 June 1918
- 9th (Service) Battalion, Rifle Brigade – left division 16 June 1918
- 42nd Company, Machine Gun Corps – formed by 24 February 1916; joined 14th Divisional MG Battalion March1918
- 42nd Trench Mortar Battery – formed at Arras on 15 April 1916; broken up as infantry reinforcements by 14 April 1918

Following massive casualties during the German spring offensive all infantry battalions of 14th (L) Division were reduced to training cadres (TCs) in April. Various other units were attached to the division during May to work on the Lillers–Steenbecque–Morbecque defence line. The division then proceeded from Boulogne to Brookwood and Cowshott Camp in England on 17 June to be reconstituted with TCs brought up to strength with troops of medical category B. 42nd Brigade was then composed as follows:

- 6th (Wiltshire Yeomanry) Battalion, Wiltshire Regiment – formerly in 58th Bde, 19th (Western) Division; TC joined at Boulogne 16 June 1918, on 18 June absorbed 9th Battalion Dorsetshire Regiment (formed at Aldeburgh 1 June 1918)
- 16th (Service) Battalion, Manchester Regiment (1st City) – formerly in 90th Bde, 30th Division; TC joined at Boulogne 16 June 1918; on 21 June absorbed 29th Battalion, Manchester Regiment (formed at North Walsham 1 June 1918)
- 14th (Service) Battalion, Argyll and Sutherland Highlanders – formerly in 120th Bde, 40th Division; TC joined at Boulogne 16 June 1918; on 21 June absorbed 17th Battalion, Argyll and Sutherland Highlanders (formed at Deal 1 June 1918)
- 42nd Trench Mortar Battery – reformed in England June 1918

=== Service ===
14th (Light) Division crossed to France in May 1915 and completed its concentration around Watten, north-west of Saint-Omer, by 25 May. Thereafter it served on the Western Front in the following operations:

1915

- Hooge (German liquid fire attack) 30–31 July
- Second Attack on Bellewaarde 25 September

1916

- Battle of the Somme:
  - Battle of Delville Wood 13–30 August
  - Battle of Flers–Courcelette 15–16 September

1917

- German Retreat to the Hindenburg Line 15 March–5 April
- Battle of Arras:
  - First Battle of the Scarpe 9–12 April
  - Third Battle of the Scarpe 3–4 May
- Third Battle of Ypres:
  - Battle of Langemarck 18 August
  - Fighting on the Menin Road 22–26 August
  - First Battle of Passchendaele 12 October

1918

- German spring offensive:
  - Battle of St Quentin 21–23 March
  - Battle of the Avre 4 April

Following casualties in the German spring offensive, 14th (L) Division was withdrawn to England to be reconstituted (see above). It returned to the Western Front in July and participated in the following actions:

- Hundred Days Offensive:
  - Fifth Battle of Ypres 28 September–2 October
  - Battle of Courtrai 14–19 October

Following the Armistice with Germany demobilisation of 14th (L) Division began in December 1918 and the division and is formations ceased to exist on 24 March 1919.

=== Commanders ===
The following officers commanded the brigade during the war:

- Brigadier-General C.J. Markham from 24 August 1914
- Brig-Gen F.A. Dudgeon from 16 August 1915; promoted to command 56th (1/1st London) Division
- Brig-Gen G.N.B. Forster from 9 August 1917; killed 4 April 1918
- Brig-Gen C.R.P. Winser, temporary from 4 April 1918 (also 41st Bde)
- Brig-Gen H.T. Dobbin from 7 April 1918

=== Insignia ===
The formation sign of 14th (L) Division was a light infantry green rectangle crossed by two white lines, one horizontal the other diagonal. Within the division the units wore a variety of identifying signs; for 42nd Bde these were:

- 7th OBLI: two horizontal red bars on each sleeve
- 5th KSLI: two horizontal red bars on the back of the jacket
- 9th KRRC: green horizontal bar on the back; from March 1917 inverted triangles of company colours worn on both sleeves
- 9th Rifle Brigade: two horizontal black bars, position unknown
- 42nd MG Co: turquoise horizontal bar above a maroon horizontal bar, position unknown
- 42nd TM Bty: dark blue circle, position unknown

== World War II ==
The brigade HQ was reformed in the UK on 26 July 1943 during World War II, and on landing in North Africa on 25 August was formed as a security force to protect lines of communication. In November 1943, the brigade HQ was redesignated as the HQ of the 57th Infantry Division for deception purposes, with its battalions playing the role of brigades.

=== Order of battle ===
- 30th Battalion, Royal Northumberland Fusiliers – 25 August 1943 to 30 April 1944, '170 Brigade' from 9 November 1943
- 30th Battalion, Bedfordshire and Hertfordshire Regiment – 25 August 1943 to 27 July 1944, '172 Brigade' from 26 December 1943 to 27 July 1944
- 30th Battalion, Duke of Cornwall's Light Infantry – 25 August 1943 to 5 May 1944
- 30th Battalion, Royal Norfolk Regiment– 10 October 1943 to 20 October 1943
- 30th Battalion, Green Howards – 5 November 1943 to 26 December 1943, '172 Brigade' from 9 November 1943 to 26 December 1943
- 31st Battalion, Suffolk Regiment – 5 November 1943 to 18 June 1944, '171 Brigade' from 9 November 1943 to 19 June 1944

=== Commander ===
The brigade commander was Brigadier P.H. Cadoux-Hudson, who was given the local rank of Major-General as purported commander of '57th Division'.

The Brigade headquarters was disbanded in North Africa on 29 July 1944.

== Postwar ==
Headquarters 42 (North West) Brigade was reformed in UK Land Forces at The Castle, Chester in 1982 before relocating to Fulwood Barracks in 1986. Its number perpetuated the memory of the 42nd (East Lancashire) Infantry Division, and became the regional military headquarters for North West England.

The structure in 1989 was as follows:

- 1st Battalion, Cheshire Regiment
- 3rd Battalion, The Light Infantry
- Duke of Lancaster's Own Yeomanry (V) - Chorley
- 3rd Battalion, The Cheshire Regiment (V) - Runcorn
- 4th Battalion, The Queen's Lancashire Regiment (V) - Preston
- 4th Battalion, The King's Own Royal Border Regiment - Lancaster
- 5th/8th Battalion, The King's Regiment - Warrington
- 103rd (Lancashire) Air Defence Regiment, Royal Artillery - Liverpool
- 75th Engineer Regiment, Royal Engineers (V) - Manchester
- 33rd (Lancashire and Cheshire) Signal Regiment, Royal Corps of Signals
- 156th (Merseyside & Greater Manchester) Transport Regiment, Royal Corps of Transport (V), Birkenhead
- 207th (Manchester) General Hospital, Royal Army Medical Corps (V), Blackburn
- 208th (Merseyside) General Hospital, Royal Army Medical Corps (V), Ellesmere Port

Under Army 2020, it was renamed 42nd Infantry Brigade and became the Regional Point of Command for the British Army in the region of North West England and the Isle of Man. Its headquarters were situated at Fulwood Barracks in Preston. Units included:

- 2nd Battalion, Duke of Lancaster's Regiment in Weeton (rotates to British Forces Cyprus)
- 2nd Battalion, Mercian Regiment in Chester
- 4th Battalion, Duke of Lancaster's Regiment in Preston (Army Reserve - paired with 2nd Battalion, Duke of Lancaster's Regiment)
- 4th Battalion, Mercian Regiment in Wolverhampton (Army Reserve - paired with 2nd Battalion, Mercian Regiment)

The brigade was disbanded in January 2017, being reduced in status to become the cadets-and-reservists Headquarters North West, now part of Regional Command.

== Sources ==
- L.S. Amery (ed), The Times History of the War in South Africa 1899-1902, London: Sampson Low, Marston, 7 Vols 1900–09.
- Maj A.F. Becke,History of the Great War: Order of Battle of Divisions, Part 2a: The Territorial Force Mounted Divisions and the 1st-Line Territorial Force Divisions (42–56), London: HM Stationery Office, 1935/Uckfield: Naval & Military Press, 2007, ISBN 1-847347-39-8.
- Maj A.F. Becke,History of the Great War: Order of Battle of Divisions, Part 3a: New Army Divisions (9–26), London: HM Stationery Office, 1938/Uckfield: Naval & Military Press, 2007, ISBN 1-847347-41-X.
- Clive Elderton & Gary Gibbs, World War One British Army Corps and Divisional Signs, Wokingham: Military History Society, 2018.
- Mike Hibberd, Infantry Divisions, Identification Schemes 1917, Wokingham: Military History Society, 2016.
- Brig E.A. James, British Regiments 1914–18, London: Samson Books, 1978, ISBN 0-906304-03-2/Uckfield: Naval & Military Press, 2001, ISBN 978-1-84342-197-9.
- Lt-Col H.F. Joslen, Orders of Battle, United Kingdom and Colonial Formations and Units in the Second World War, 1939–1945, London: HM Stationery Office, 1960/London: London Stamp Exchange, 1990, ISBN 0-948130-03-2/Uckfield: Naval & Military Press, 2003, ISBN 1-843424-74-6.
- Instructions Issued by The War Office During August, 1914, London: HM Stationery Office, 1916

=== External sources ===
- Chris Baker, The Long, Long Trail
- R. Mark Davies, British Orders of Battle & TO&Es 1980-1989
- 42 (North West) Brigade - on British Army official website
