= 186th Brigade =

186th Brigade may refer to:

- 186th (2/2nd West Riding) Brigade, United Kingdom
- 186th (Deptford) Howitzer Brigade, Royal Field Artillery, United Kingdom

== See also ==
- 186th Regiment (disambiguation)
