= George Norman Bowes Forster =

British Army officer (1872–1918)

Brigadier General George Norman Bowes Forster CMG DSO
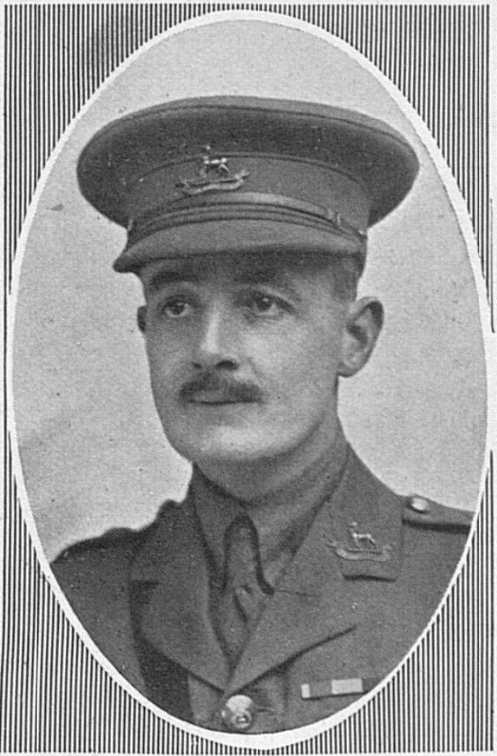
- Born: October 1872
- Died: 4 April 1918 (aged 45)

Brigadier General George Norman Bowes Forster, CMG, DSO (October 1872 – 4 April 1918) was a British Army officer. He was killed during the Battle of the Avre, commanding the 42nd Brigade, which he had taken command of in August 1917 when he was promoted to temporary brigadier-general, when his headquarters were overrun. According to one account, he was captured by the Germans, then shortly afterward was killed by a stray bullet.

His body was never found. He is commemorated on the Pozières Memorial, the most senior officer commemorated there.

== Military career ==
He was on 12 February 1902 appointed an adjutant of a battalion of his regiment.

== Military career ==
He graduated from the Royal Military College, Sandhurst, and was commissioned as a second lieutenant into the Royal Warwickshire Regiment of the British Army in May 1893.
