= 114th Siege Battery, Royal Garrison Artillery =

114th Siege Battery, RGA
- Cap Badge of the Royal Regiment of Artillery
- Active: 8 March 1916–1919
- Country: United Kingdom
- Branch: British Army
- Role: Siege Artillery
- Part of: Royal Garrison Artillery
- Garrison/HQ: Pembroke Dock
- Engagements: Battle of the Somme; Battle of Vimy Ridge; Third Battle of Ypres; German spring offensive Battle of the Avre; Battle of Amiens; Battle of the Selle

114th Siege Battery, was a heavy howitzer unit of the Royal Garrison Artillery (RGA) formed in Wales during World War I. It saw active service on the Western Front at the Somme, Vimy Ridge and Ypres, against the German spring offensive, and in the final Hundred Days Offensive.

== Mobilisation ==
The 114th Siege Bty was formed at Pembroke Dock under Army Council Instruction 535 of 8 March 1916, which laid down that it was to follow the establishment for 'New Army' (Kitchener's Army) units, with a Territorial Force (TF) cadre of three officers and 78 men (the wartime establishment of an RGA Company of the TF) from the Pembroke Royal Garrison Artillery. It went out to the Western Front on 14 June 1916 equipped with four modern 6-inch 26 cwt Howitzers and joined 32nd Heavy Artillery Group (HAG) with Reserve Army (later Fifth Army).

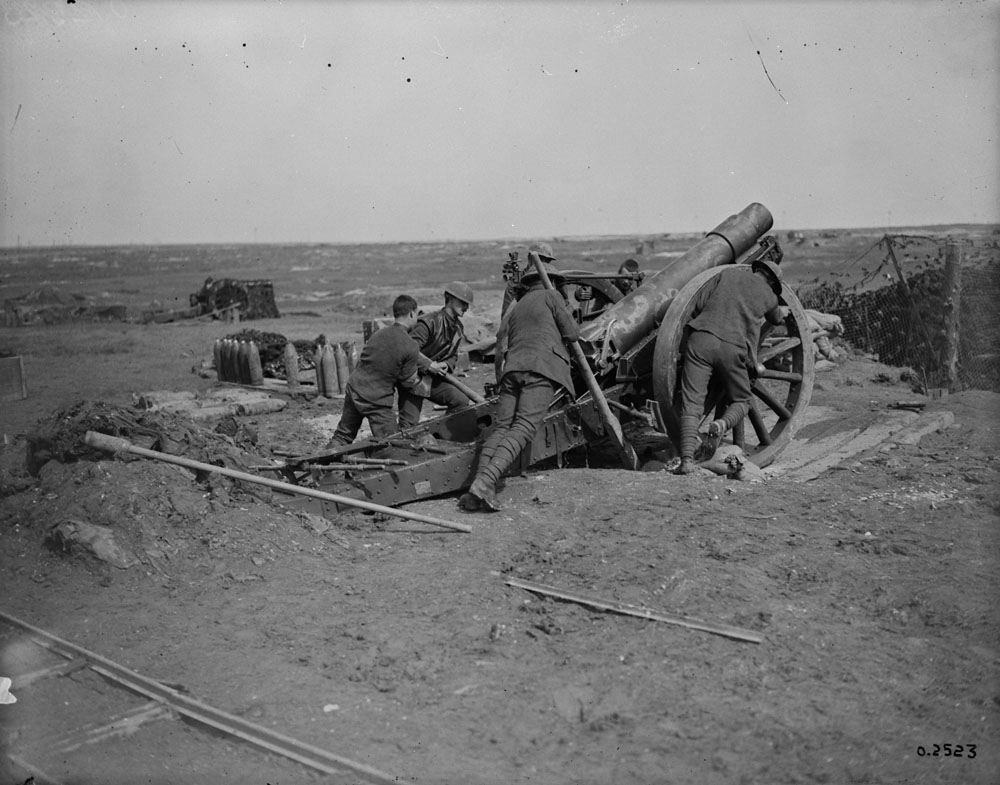
Crew positioning a 6-inch 26 cwt howitzer in 1918.

The battery moved to 31st HAG with Third Army on 8 July and then to 28th HAG with First Army on 31 July. 28th HAG joined Fourth Army on 10 September for the Battle of Flers-Courcelette (15–22 September) in the continuing Somme Offensive. By now massive quantities of artillery were employed for each phase of the offensive as Fourth Army attacked again and again through the autumn:

- Battle of Morval (25–28 September)
- Battle of Le Transloy (1–18 October)
- Battle of the Ancre Heights (3–11 November)
- Battle of the Ancre (13–18 November)

The battery was withdrawn from the line for rest, training etc. from 27 December to 20 January 1917.

== Vimy ==
The battery moved to 44th (South African) HAG with First Army on 22 March 1917. The group supported the Canadian Corps at the Battle of Vimy Ridge on 9 April. The artillery plan for the heavy guns emphasised counter-battery (CB) fire. At Zero hour, while the field guns laid down a Creeping barrage to protect the advancing infantry, the heavy howitzers fired 450 yards (410 m) further ahead to hit the rear areas on the reverse slope of the ridge, especially known gun positions. The attack went in on 9 April with the Canadian Corps successfully capturing Vimy Ridge. Fighting in the southern sector (the Battle of Arras) continued into May.

114th Siege Bty remained with First Army, transferring to 77th HAG on 15 April, to 18th HAG on 15 May and then moving to 71st HAG on 28 May (actually joining it 3 June). However, on 12 June it joined 88th HAG with Second Army in the Ypres Salient, coming under Fifth Army (Note: Apparently 88th HAG transferred from Second to Fifth Army with II Corps, to which 376th Siege Bty was posted on arrival.) by 1 August during the Battle of Pilckem Ridge) that launched the Third Ypres Offensive. Just before the battle, on 28 July, a section from the newly arrived 376th Siege Bty joined, bringing 114th Siege Bty up to a strength of six howitzers. (Note: 376th Siege Battery, RGA, was formed on 12 February 1917 at Prees Heath Army Camp; the other section went to reinforce 9th Siege Bty.)

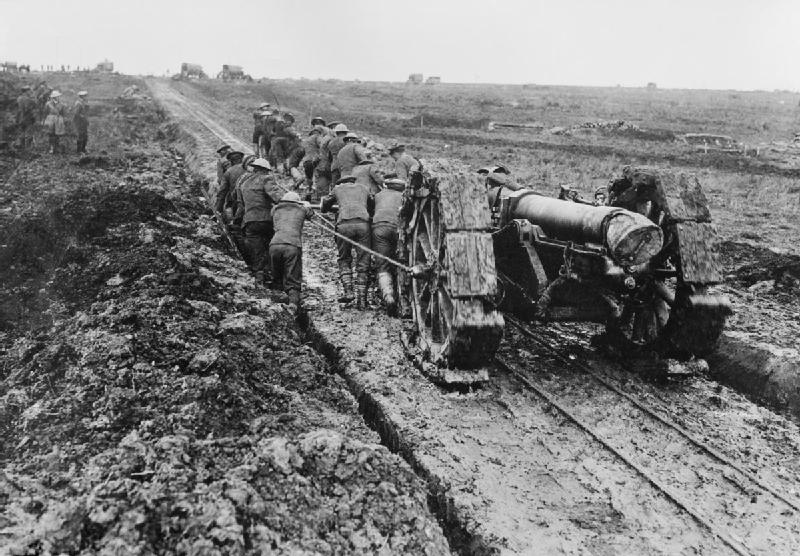
6-inch howitzer being moved through mud on the Western Front.

== Ypres ==
Gun batteries were packed into the Ypres Salient – II Corps had 36 RGA batteries in the Dickebusch area – where they were under observation and CB fire from the Germans on the higher ground. Casualties among guns and gunners were high, and II Corps had failed to make much progress. A second push on 16 August (the Battle of Langemarck) suffered from rushed artillery planning and was unsuccessful. The offensive continued through the summer and autumn of 1917: the Battles of the Menin Road, Polygon Wood and Broodseinde were highly successful because of the weight of artillery brought to bear on German positions. But as the offensive continued with the Battle of Poelcappelle and First and Second Battles of Passchendaele, the tables were turned: British batteries were clearly observable from the Passchendaele Ridge and were subjected to CB fire, while their own guns sank into the mud and became difficult to aim and fire.

There was no respite for the gunners: although 88th HAG moved out of the Salient in October, 114th Siege Bty stayed with Fifth Army, transferring to 68th HAG on 1 October. By now HAG allocations were becoming more fixed, and on 1 February 1918 they were converted into permanent RGA brigades. 68th Brigade was defined as an '8-inch Howitzer' brigade, but only one of its units was equipped with such guns, the remainder operating 6-inch howitzers. 114th Siege Bty remained with this brigade until the Armistice.

== Spring Offensive ==
Fifth Army was attacked on 21 March 1918, the first day of the German spring offensive. Artillery Observation Posts (OPs) were blinded by early morning mist and many were overrun along with the infantry in the forward zone. The German bombardment was savage. The batteries of 68th Bde were with XIX Corps, which was particularly hard hit, the attackers forcing their way down the flanks of the two front line divisions. Cavalry and infantry reserves held the line for a while and 68th Bde was still intact at the end of the first day, unlike some heavy units in other parts of the front, either caught in the fighting or forced to abandon their guns as the Germans advanced rapidly. Next day the Germans continued their advance, and 68th Bde stood at Roise trying to stem the tide before pulling out after dark. On 23 March XIX Corps was forced to conform to retreats by its neighbours towards the Somme, and over following days the RGA struggled to get their guns back during the 'Great Retreat'.

Fourth Army HQ took over all of Fifth Army's formations and units on 2 April. The last attack in the first phase of the German offensive came in on 4 April (the Battle of the Avre). The two divisions now holding the front were pushed back, but they were backed by a mass of field and heavy artillery, including the batteries of 68th Bde, and the attack was stopped dead by the guns. Further attacks came on other parts of the front for several months, but none broke through completely.

== Hundred Days ==
The Allied Hundred Days Offensive opened at 04.20 on 8 August at the Battle of Amiens. By now 68th Bde was supporting the Australian Corps on whose front the barrage fired by field and heavy artillery was so thick and accurate that scarcely a German shell fell after 05.40, and all the Australian objectives were secured.

The Allied advance continued through the autumn up to the River Selle. Preparations to cross it began on 11 October, with 68th Bde allocated to the II US Corps, which was operating under Fourth Army's command and had no artillery of its own. The weather was misty, which hindered air and ground observation for counter-battery fire, but when the assault went in on the morning of 17 October the Selle itself was not much of an obstacle on II US Corps' front, and the objectives were taken.

For the final part of the Battle of the Selle on 23 October, II US Corps was relieved by the British IX Corps, which took over most of its Australian and RGA artillery. This massive corps artillery reserve supported the attack into the wooded slopeds beyond the Selle. Again, bad weather hindered air observation and CB work before the attack, but the barrage was deadly accurate. As the regimental historian relates, "The guns of Fourth Army demonstrated, on 23rd October, the crushing effect of well co-ordinated massed artillery. They simply swept away the opposition". After a pause to regroup and reconnoitre, IX Corps stormed across the Sambre–Oise Canal on 4 November (the Battle of the Sambre). After that the campaign became a pursuit of a beaten enemy, in which the slow-moving siege guns could play no part. The war ended with the Armistice with Germany on 11 November.

114th Siege Battery was disbanded in 1919.
