= 39th (Deptford) Divisional Artillery =

- Royal Artillery cap badge
- Active: 1915–19
- Country: United Kingdom
- Branch: Kitchener's Army
- Role: Field Artillery
- Size: 2–4 Artillery brigades
- Part of: 39th Division
- Garrison/HQ: Deptford
- Nickname: Deptford Artillery
- Patron: William Wayland, Mayor of Deptford
- Engagements: Battle of the Boar's Head; Battle of the Somme; Third Battle of Ypres; German spring offensive Battle of the Avre; Hundred Days Offensive

Insignia
- 39th Division formation sign

The 39th (Deptford) Divisional Artillery (39th DA) was a Royal Artillery force raised as part of 'Kitchener's Army' in early 1915. Recruited in Deptford, South London, the units served with the 'Pals battalions' of the 39th Division on the Western Front for two years. They saw action at the Somme, Ypres, and the German spring offensive, including the Battle of the Avre, described as 'one of the finest artillery stories of the whole war'. The units then operated as an independent artillery formation during the Allied Hundred Days Offensive.

== Background ==
On 6 August 1914, less than 48 hours after Britain's declaration of war, Parliament sanctioned an increase of 500,000 men for the Regular British Army, and the newly appointed Secretary of State for War, Earl Kitchener of Khartoum issued his famous call to arms: 'Your King and Country Need You', urging the first 100,000 volunteers to come forward. This group of six divisions with supporting arms became known as Kitchener's First New Army, or 'K1'. The flood of volunteers overwhelmed the ability of the army to absorb and organise them, and by the time the Fifth New Army (K5) was authorised on 10 December 1914, many of the units were being organised as 'Pals battalions' under the auspices of mayors and corporations of towns up and down the country.

The 39th Division was one of the last K5 divisions to be formed, being authorised on 27 April 1915. Most of the division's infantry units were Pals battalions raised from London and South Coast of England, with a few from other parts of the UK, and all the Royal Artillery (RA) units were raised in Deptford, South East London.

== Recruitment ==
The Metropolitan Borough of Deptford set up a recruiting committee in December 1914, and the Mayor, Councillor William Wayland, announced at a council meeting on 18 May 1915 that he had been approached by Kitchener with a proposal for recruiting an infantry battalion or artillery brigade, which the council endorsed. Next day the official War Office (WO) authorisation was issued to the Mayor and Borough of Deptford to raise a brigade (Note: The artillery component of a British infantry division during World War I was commanded by a brigadier-general and was effectively a brigade, but was never referred to as such because 'brigade' was the term used by the Royal Artillery to designate a regimental-sized unit, of which there were initially four in each division.) of the Royal Field Artillery (RFA), to be numbered CLXXIV (174th). A recruiting office was set up in Deptford Town Hall and the local response was extremely good: 200 men had enlisted by 27 May. By August the borough had raised the whole artillery for an infantry division, including three more RFA brigades (CLXXIX (179th Bde), CLXXXIV (184th), and CLXXVII Howitzer (186th (H) Bde)), the 137th Heavy Battery of the Royal Garrison Artillery, and the Divisional Ammunition Column (DAC), with a total of 2500 men recruited from Deptford, Lee Green, Brockley, New Cross and neighbouring Greenwich. (Note: The authorisations by the War Office were actually issued on 3 June (CLXXIX), 11 June (DAC), 20 July (CLXXXIV), and 21 August (remainder).)

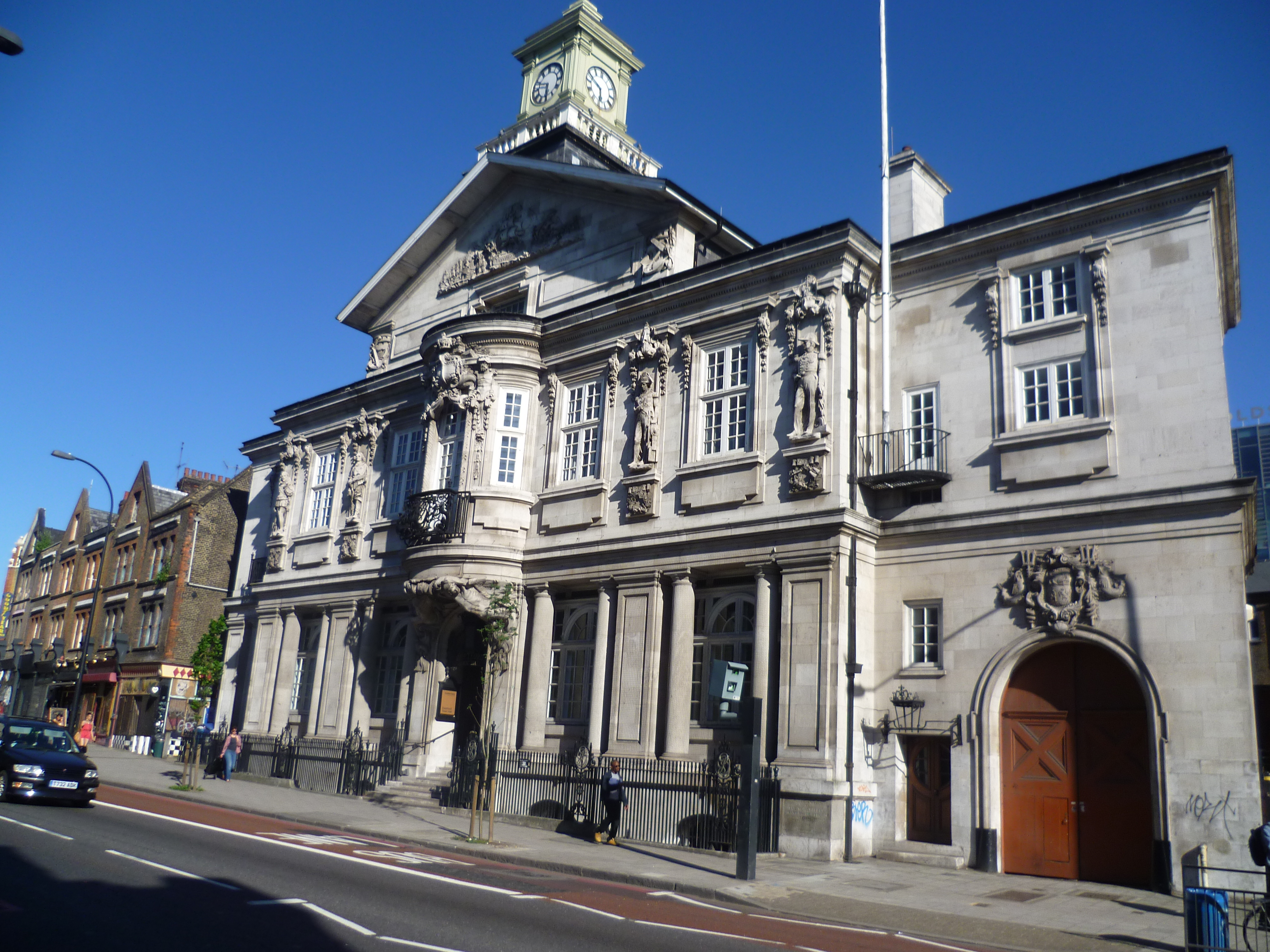
Deptford Town Hall, used as a recruiting office.

39th (Deptford) Divisional Artillery

- CLXXIV (Deptford) Brigade, RFA
- CLXXIX (Deptford) Brigade, RFA
- CLXXXIV (Deptford) Brigade, RFA
- CLXXXVI (Deptford) Howitzer Brigade, RFA
- 39th (Deptford) Divisional Ammunition Column, RFA
- 137th (Deptford) Heavy Battery and Ammunition Column, RGA

Each New Army RFA brigade consisted of four 4-gun batteries (designated A, B, C and D) and a Brigade Ammunition Column (BAC).

== Training ==
Major E.R. Phillips was promoted lieutenant-colonel to take command of CLXXIV Bde and set up headquarters (HQ) at the disused works of the former Thames Ironworks and Shipbuilding Company in Blackheath Road. The other units were organised in Deptford and Lee Green. There was a great shortage of equipment, but the mayor and corporation managed to obtain uniforms for CLXXIV Bde within two weeks of the town meeting. They also obtained over 2000 horses before 39th DA left the borough, with those of 137th Hvy Bty being stabled in the London County Council Tramways yard. Early training was carried out with dummy guns and ammunition waggons on Blackheath before the first two guns (18-pounders) arrived in August.

Deptford held a farewell parade for 39th DA on Blackheath on 24 September 1915 and the units marched to Aldershot where 39th Division was assembling. It joined the division on 1 October when the Divisional Artillery HQ was formed under Brigadier-General C. Goulburn as commander, Royal Artillery (CRA). (Note: The units were formally taken over by the military authorities on 25 September (CLXXIV Bde) and 1 October (CLXXIX, CLXXXIV, and CLXXXVI Bdes and DAC).) The units continued training as guns and equipment arrived. In November they moved to Milford Camp near Godalming in Surrey, with much trouble on the march caused by inexperienced drivers and horse teams. The full establishment of 18-pdr guns and 4.5-inch howitzers was received and towards the end of January 1916 the brigades moved in turn to Larkhill Camp on Salisbury Plain for target practice before being pronounced fit for service. On 2 March 39 DA (except 137th Hvy Bty) began entraining at Milford on for Southampton where CLXXIV–CLXXXVI Bdes and the DAC embarked for France on successive days, 4–8 March.

== Western Front ==
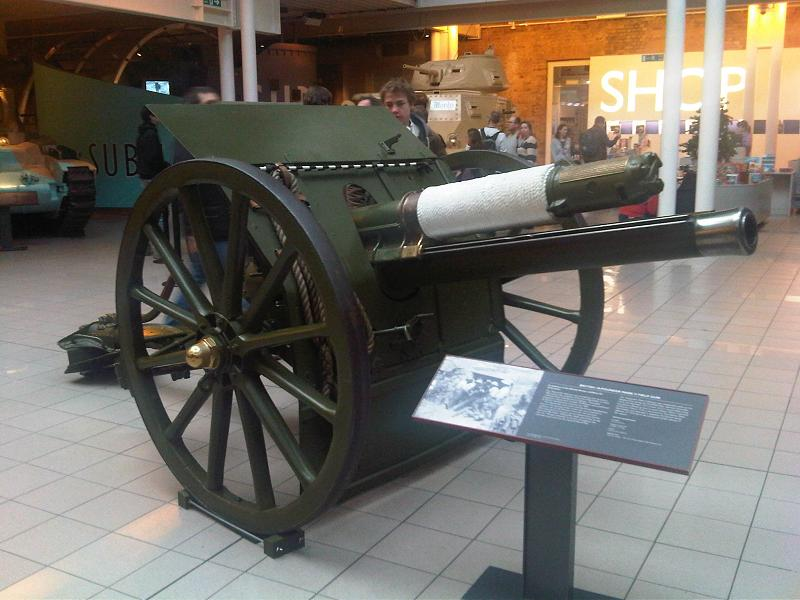
18-pounder field gun preserved at the Imperial War Museum.

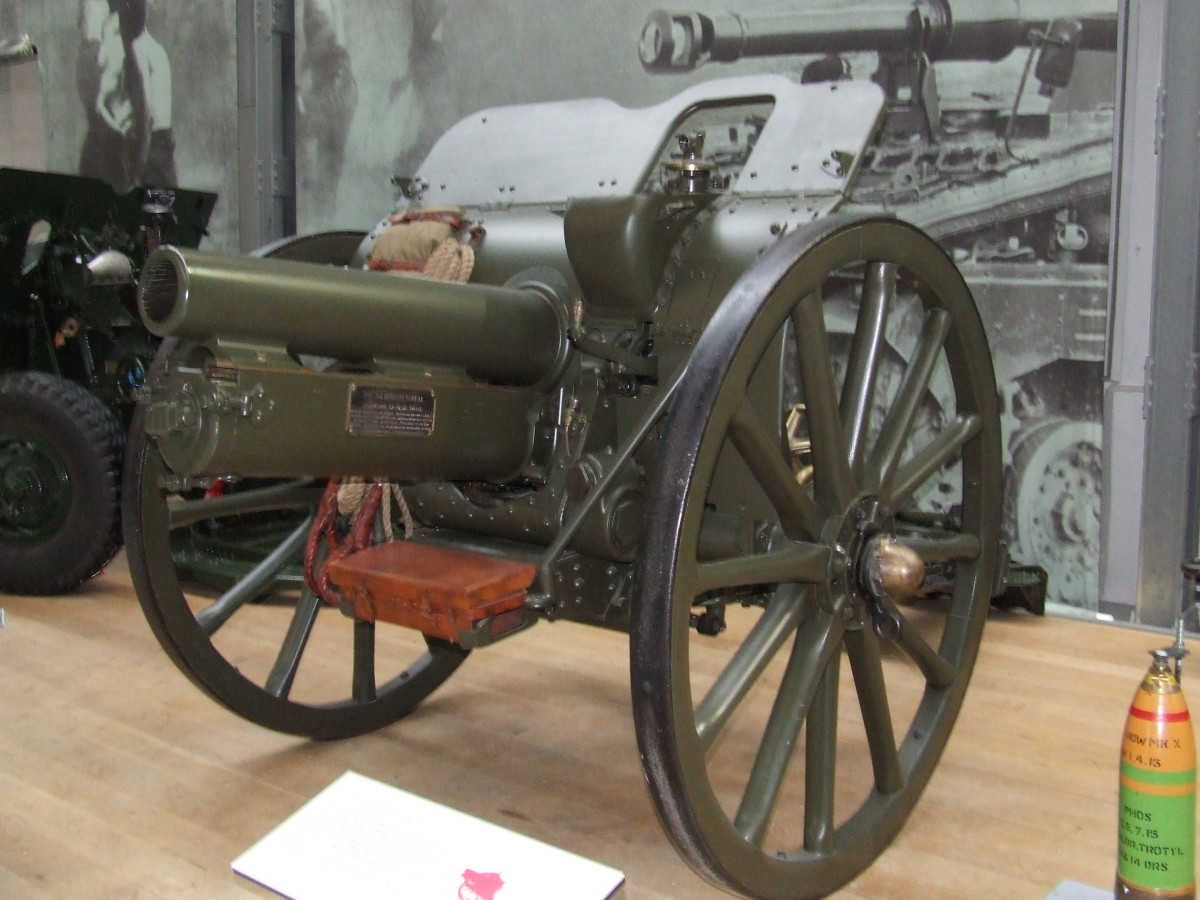
4.5-inch Howitzer at the Royal Artillery Museum.

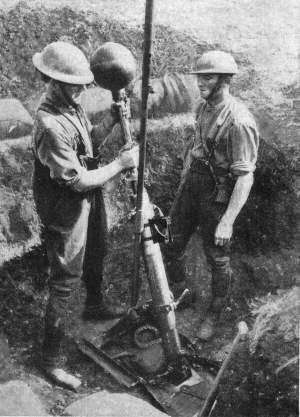
Loading a 2-inch medium mortar with its 'toffee apple' bomb.

After disembarking at Le Havre the units moved by train and road to the concentration area at Blaringhem. Almost immediately the brigades were sent up to the line to be attached to experienced units for instruction: CLXXIV and CLXXIX on 9 March and CLXXXVI (H) on 12 March, all to Estaires with 8th Divisional Artillery; CLXXXIV on 12 March to Steenwerck to join 34th Divisional Artillery. The brigades attached to 8th DA returned to their waggon lines on 23 March while CLXXXIV returned on 24 March. Next day they moved to the St Venant area, where they completed their equipment. The brigades went up for a second period of instruction 2–3 April to 14 April, three with 33rd (Camberwell) Divisional Artillery in the La Bassée area often used to train new arrivals, and CLXXXIV with 38th (Welsh) DA. 39th Divisional Artillery was then deemed ready to take over its own section of the line, and it relieved 38th (W) DA in the Festubert–Givenchy area between 14 and 16 April.

=== Reorganisation ===
The field artillery of the British Expeditionary Force (BEF) was undergoing reorganisation in the light of experience so far in the war. On 21 March the division was ordered to form a brigade of three medium trench mortar batteries (TMBs) under a Divisional Trench Mortar Officer (DTMO). In 39th Division the men were provided by the RFA gun brigades and DAC; X/39, Y/39 and Z/39 Medium TMBs were each equipped with four 2-inch medium mortars. On 20 May the BACs were absorbed by the DAC and on the same day the field brigades were reorganised as three batteries of 18-pdrs and one of 4.5-inch howitzers:

- CLXXIV Bde: B Bty became A/CLXXXVI, D Bty became B Bty, and A (H)/CLXXXVI joined as D (H) Bty
- CLXXIX Bde: C Bty became C/CLXXXVI, D Bty became C Bty, and B (H)/CLXXXVI joined as D (H) Bty
- CLXXXIV Bde: B Bty became B/CLXXXVI, D Bty became B Bty, and C (H)/CLXXXVI joined as D (H) Bty
- CLXXXVI Bde: joined by B/CLXXIV, B/CLXXXIV and C/CLXXIX, and retained D (H) Bty.

=== Battle of the Somme ===
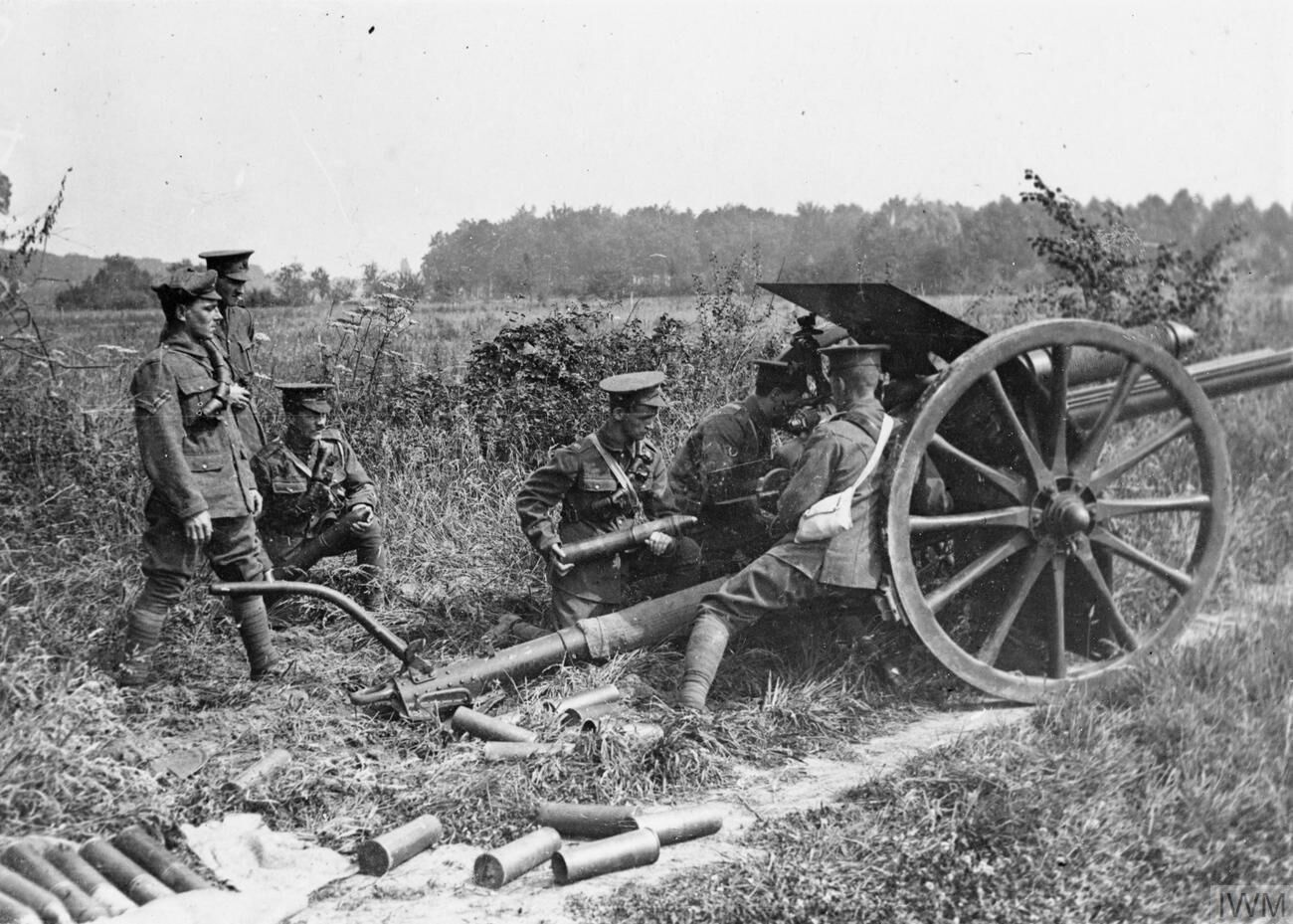
18-pounder in action on the Somme, August 1916.

From April to June the guns concentrated on registering the enemy's front line positions, machine guns posts and observation posts (OPs), shooting at enemy working parties, and firing in support of trench raids. On 29 June the guns began a preliminary bombardment and wire-cutting for an operation against a German position known as the Boar's Head. The small Battle of the Boar's Head on 30 June was a diversion from the 'Big Push' (the Battle of the Somme) that was due to begin next day. It was 39th Division's first attack, carried out by 116th Brigade comprising the three 'Southdowns' battalions of the Royal Sussex Regiment ('Lowther's Lambs'). The wirecutting was reported as very effective, and 39th DA began the final bombardment just before 03.00, the infantry going 'over the top' shortly afterwards. The guns then lengthened their range and put down an intense barrage. The divisional artillery fired over 20,000 rounds during the bombardment, but although the front line trench was reported to be full of German casualties when the British infantry entered, the second line was strongly held and the Southdowns were driven out of their gains with heavy casualties by the end of the day.

During June 39 DA HQ moved to Béthune and some of the batteries were moved around for special shoots, but in early August they were pulled out for rest before being sent south to join the Somme Offensive. A heavy TMB (V/39) equipped with 9.45-inch mortars was formed on 27 August, the personnel coming from Third Army School of Mortars.

39th Division went into the line between Beaumont-Hamel and the River Ancre on 28 August. On 3 September it made an attack to assist a larger attack on the other side of the river: 39th DA fired from 05.00 to 12.00, effectively cutting the wire and attracting considerable enemy counter-battery (CB) fire, though suffering few casualties. The division's infantry took the German front trench but most were unable to push on, being held up by machine gun fire from St Pierre Divion on the flank, and were withdrawn by the end of the day.

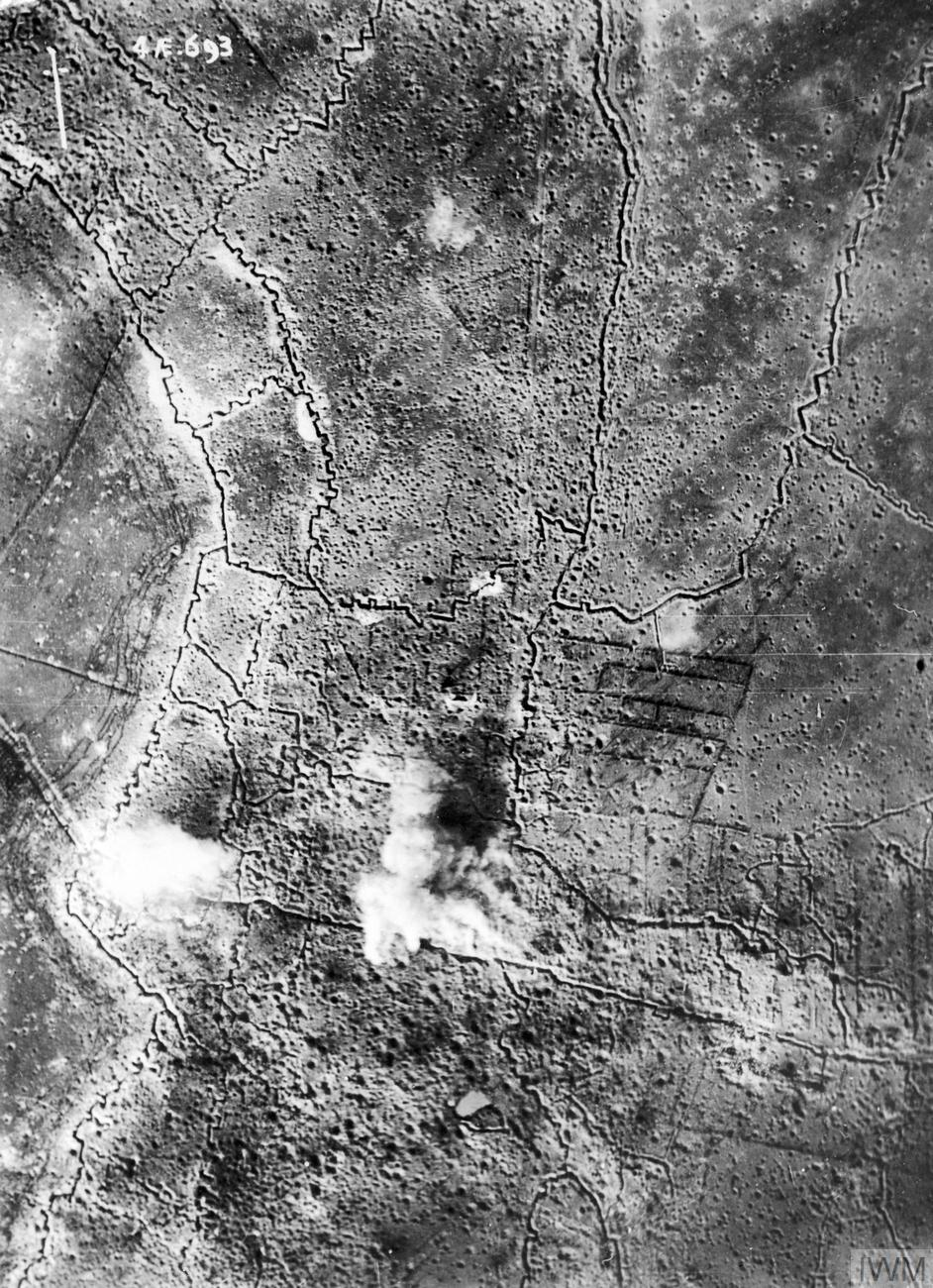
Aerial photograph of Thiepval under bombardment.

From 23 September 39th DA cooperated in the attack on Thiepval Ridge, firing from its flanking position on the Ancre against the river crossings and into the German rear. The assault on 26 September was partially successful, but the Germans retained possession of the Schwaben Redoubt. A follow-up attack on 28 September, again supported by 39th DA, captured part of this position, and attack and counter-attack fought over the ground until 30 September, the Germans suffering serious casualties from the British artillery. Meanwhile, the TMBs had been engaging targets in their immediate front, suffering their own casualties from return fire.

At the beginning of October the batteries were repositioned south of the river for the Battle of the Ancre Heights. The TMBs were strongly reinforced for a special wire-cutting operation in front of Beaumont-Hamel on 9–10 October, firing over 3000 rounds; 24 out of 48 mortars were put out of action by retaliatory fire, but casualties to the men were not heavy. The Capture of Schwaben Redoubt was completed by 39th Division on 14 October. This was a difficult operation for the artillery, most of the targets being invisible from the OPs and the weather preventing much air observation. Two enemy counter-attacks next day and another on 21 October were broken up by barrages from 39th DA in response to the infantry's SOS signals. The complete Capture of Stuff Redoubt was achieved in half an hour on 21 October: the wire had been systematically cut by a methodical bombardment, and 39th Division advanced behind an 'excellent' Creeping barrage. Observation was better here, and enemy troops massing for counter-attack were heavily shelled.

Further attacks on the Somme front were delayed by bad weather and the difficulty in bringing up ammunition – pack horses had to be used in place of waggons – but the final Battle of the Ancre was launched on 13 November. Artillery support was now massed and sophisticated creeping barrages employed. 39th Division carried out a carefully prepared attack on St Pierre Divion at 06.15. Fog in the river valley caused problems to the attackers, but also meant that some of the defenders were caught by surprise. Cut off by the barrage, they were in no condition to offer much resistance, and the village was reported secured at 08.32.

=== Further reorganisation ===
39th Divisional Artillery was withdrawn on the night of 19 November and marched north to the Ypres Salient. The horses were so exhausted that they could not pull the ammunition waggons, which had to be unloaded. After two days' march the tired men and horses required two days' rest, and it was not until 28 November that they reached the back areas behind Ypres for rest and refitting. The BEF's field artillery was now being reorganised into six-gun batteries: in each of 39th DA's brigades C Bty was broken up between A and B Bty, then CLXXXIV Bde was broken up on 30 November, its batteries joining the other brigades (A Bty as C/CLXXIV, B Bty as C/CLXXXVI and D (H) Bty as C (H)/CLXXIX). The surplus officers and men joined the DAC.

On 9 December CLXXIX Bde relieved a Belgian army unit in the line, and the other two brigades and the TMBs moved into the line north of Ypres shortly afterwards. The duties included shooting at enemy strongpoints and reprisals for enemy shellfire, while the men worked to improve the gun positions and waggon lines.

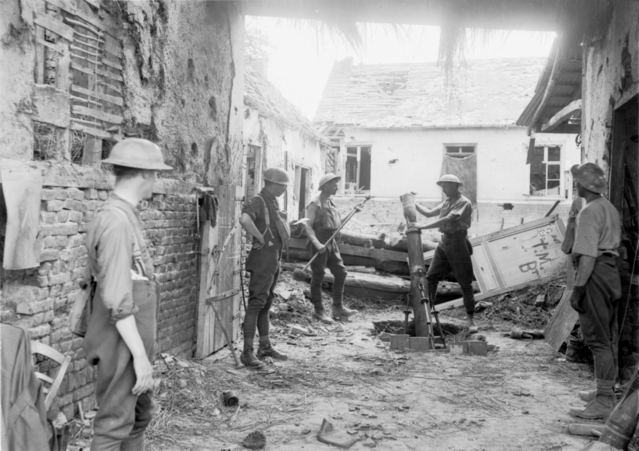
A Medium Trench Mortar Battery in action with 6-inch Newton mortars 1918.

There was a further reorganisation of 39th DA between 18 and 30 January 1917 when CLXXIX Bde was broken up: C (H) Bty was split to make up the other brigades' D (H) Btys to six howitzers each. A/CLXXIX Battery joined CCLXXVII Brigade, RFA, a Lancashire Territorial Force unit operating as an Army Field Artillery (AFA) brigade; it saw extensive service on the Western Front, supporting a wide variety of formations at Ypres, Cambrai and the battles of 1918 (see below). Similarly, B/CLXXIX Bty joined CXIX AFA Bde. D (H) Battery was split between the howitzer batteries of these two AFA brigades. CLXXIX Brigade HQ was absorbed into 39th DAC, which reformed into two gun ammunition sections and one divisional small arms ammunition section. This gave 39th DA virtually its final organisation:

- CLXXIV Bde: A, B, C Btys (each 6 × 18-pdr), D (H) Bty (6 × 4.5-inch)
- CLXXXVI Bde: A, B, C Btys (each 6 × 18-pdr), D (H) Bty (6 × 4.5-inch)
- 39th TM Bde:
  - X/39, Y/39, Z/39 Medium TMBs (re-equipped with Newton 6-inch mortars in July 1917)
  - V/39 Heavy TMB (9.45-inch mortars)

=== Third Battle of Ypres ===
On 20 February 39th DA was relieved and went into reserve until 1 March, when it took over the Zillebeke sector. There was little activity apart from artillery cooperation for trench raids while the DAC waggons were employed bring up material for the forthcoming Third Ypres Offensive. Between 10 April and 5 May the brigades, TMBs and DAC were rotated into reserve and training near the coast. The rest of May was employed in building battery positions for the coming offensive. In the first week of June 39 DA took part in two demonstration bombardments in cooperation with the Battle of Messines. From their OPs on the higher ground the Germans could see the preparations for the offensive, and carried out their own CB bombardments against the massed British guns, especially around Zillebeke. Late in June C/CLXXXVI Bty was heavily shelled and had to leave its position after two gun pits were set on fire and ammunition blown up. On 28 June CLXXXVI Bde's HQ was also driven out by heavy howitzer shells, and all the other batteries and DAC received 'more than the usual amount of attention from the enemy', losing many men and horses. CLXXXVI brigade HQ suffered another six-hour bombardment on 3 July, and the whole brigades was withdrawn. It was back in the line on 21 July as 39th Division prepared to take part in the new offensive.

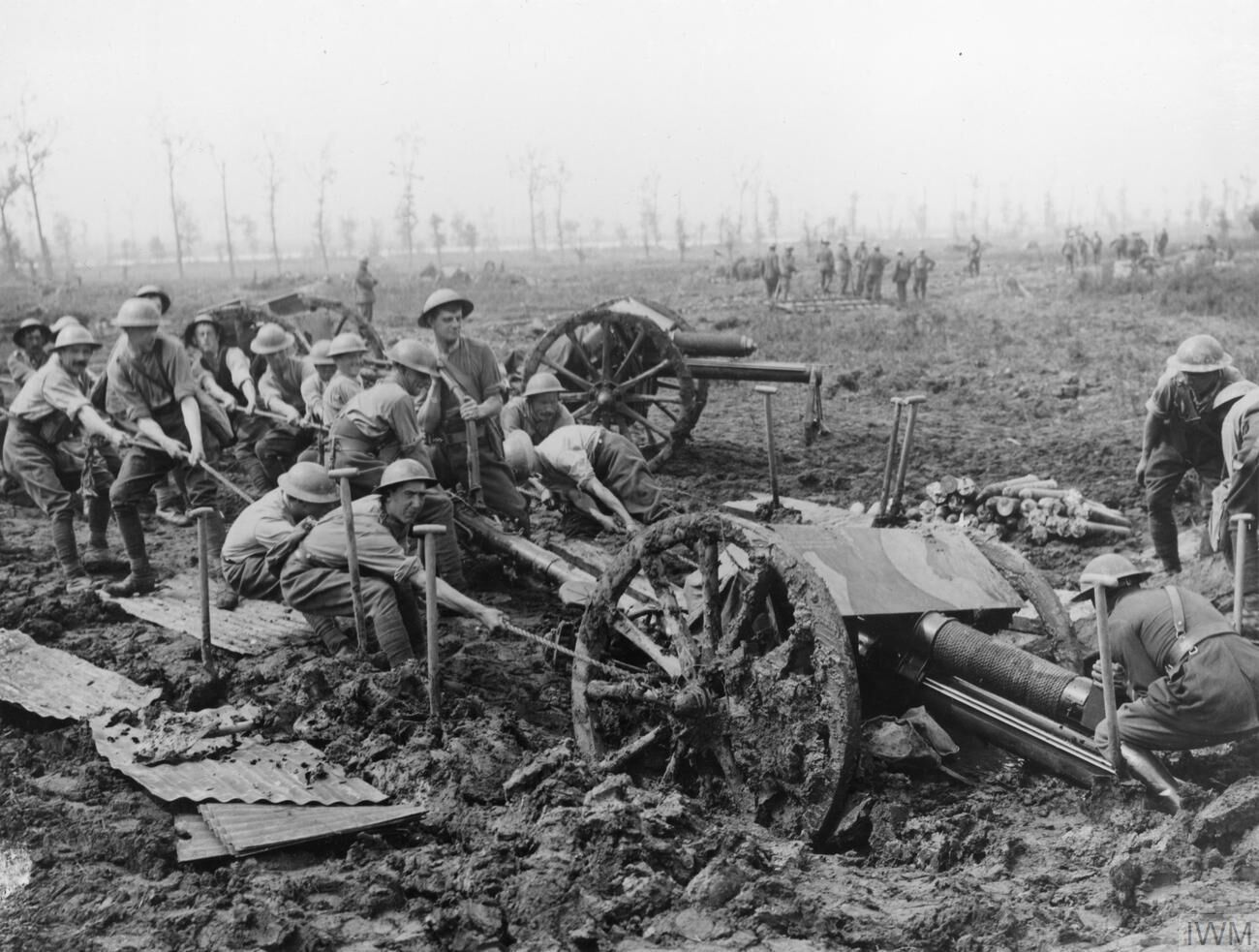
18-pounder being hauled out of mud at Zillebeke, 1917.

The offensive opened with the Battle of Pilckem Ridge on 31 July. Two thirds of the field guns fired a creeping barrage, the other third and the 4.5-inch howitzers provided the protective standing barrage to allow the assaulting troops to reorganise at each objective. The trench mortars fired Thermite flares and oil bombs at Zero hour (03.00) to help the infantry keep direction in the dark. The attacking brigades of 39th Division took the village of St Julien and the strongpoints in their front. By 08.00 they had advanced about 3,000 yards (2,700 m) to achieve their objectives and were consolidating a position along the flooded Steenbeek to provide a defensive flank for the attackers. Several field batteries moved up to the old British line to give closer support, while the reserve brigade pushed beyond the Steenbeek. But it began to rain, and soon it was almost impossible for the exhausted gunners to get their guns forward through the devastation and mud, and further progress was halted that evening. Flanking fire and fierce German counter-attacks pushed the leading battalions back to the line of the Steenbeek. Here the Germans, wading through mud, were halted by the SOS barrage fired by the field artillery. Elsewhere the battle had been a disappointment to the British, and 39th Division was left holding onto the Steenbeek in mud and under constant shellfire until it was relieved on 5 August. The field batteries continued in action under terrible conditions, suffering from CB fire, while the DAC was bombed and shelled at night, and casualties were high. The next attack, the Battle of Langemarck, was launched on 16 August, with even less success than before. 39th Divisional Artillery was finally relieved on 23 August.

39th Divisional Artillery returned to the front on 1 September and was involved in all the fighting that month, even if the division's infantry were not. Although there were minor operations, the next offensive phase (the Battle of the Menin Road Ridge) was delayed by the weather and the need to build up ammunition. This time the weight of artillery was doubled and the frontage of attack narrowed. There were significant casualties among the massed field batteries from CB fire in the days preceding the attack, but practice barrages were fired, and numerous trench raids were supported by the guns. Field gun barrages were fired at night to isolate German gun positions and prevent them resupplying. Once again 39th Division's role was to form a defensive flank, this time in the southern sector around Shrewsbury Forest. The attack started at 05.40 on 20 September. The creeping barrage consisted of five belts, the rearmost ('A', nearest the attacking infantry) being fired by half the 18-pdrs, of which one-third of the batteries were 'superimposed' so that they could be redirected to fire at targets of opportunity without leaving a gap in the barrage. The 'B' barrage line 200 yards (180 m) ahead was provided by the 4.5s and the rest of the 18-pdrs. It was impressed on the infantry that they were to follow the barrage closely, and despite the muddy conditions the attack was a great success. The gunners were then able to break up German counter-attacks, despite their own exhaustion.

The artillery began moving forward on the afternoon of 20 September to prepare for the next phase, the Battle of Polygon Wood on 26 September. The barrages planned were similar to those at the Menin Road, and practice barrages swept across the German positions every day. 39th Division's infantry sidestepped to relieve 41st Division and make a subsidiary attack to capture the 'Tower Hamlets' spur. However, it failed in this attempt, held up by a strongpoint known as 'The Quadrilateral'. The division's infantry were rested after this attack, but 39th DA remained in the line, supporting other formations during the Battles of Broodseinde (4 October) and Poelcappelle (9 October).

39th Divisional Artillery was withdrawn for rest in mid-October, missing the desperate Second Battle of Passchendaele in which the division's infantry played a minor part. While it was out of the line Brig-Gen Gilson, the CRA who had commanded 39th DA since it landed in France, was promoted to be CRA for X Corps. He was replaced by Brig-Gen G.A.S. Cape. 39th Divisional Artillery returned to the front between 4 and 18 November, and again from 22 November, participating in harassing fire against the enemy. Although the gun detachments had some cover from the weather and enemy fire in captured pillboxes, the battery positions were in mud-filled shell craters and guns could scarcely be moved, and the waggon lines were under periodic shelling.

=== Winter 1917–18 ===
During the winter of 1917–18 the commanders of both field gun brigades were replaced, with Lt-Col Lord Alfred Browne, younger son of the Marquess of Sligo, taking command of CLXXXVI Bde. During December this brigade provided No 2 Group of field artillery for 33rd (Camberwell) DA in the line. Meanwhile, the DAC and TMBs were engaged in salvaging ammunition and derelict guns from the battlefields. On 7 February 1918, Z/39 was split between X and Y Medium TMBs to bring them up to six 6-inch mortars each, and V/39 Heavy TMB was transferred to Corps.

39th Divisional Artillery had been relieved for rest on 22 December. When it returned to the forward area in January there had been heavy falls of snow, and the units could only move slowly along the roads into position. The guns were 'in action' for 8 January, and came under heavy German bombardment on 11 January: although casualties were low, several guns were damaged. The batteries were withdrawn again on 23 January and moved by rail to the southern part of the BEF's front, occupying the line in the Bray-sur-Somme area, while the brigades went by turns for training. The sector was relatively quiet, but Brig-Gen Cape was killed on 18 March while conducting a Staff ride as acting divisional commander, and Lt-Col E.W.S. Brooke of CLXXIV Bde took temporary command of 39th DA.

=== German Spring Offensive ===
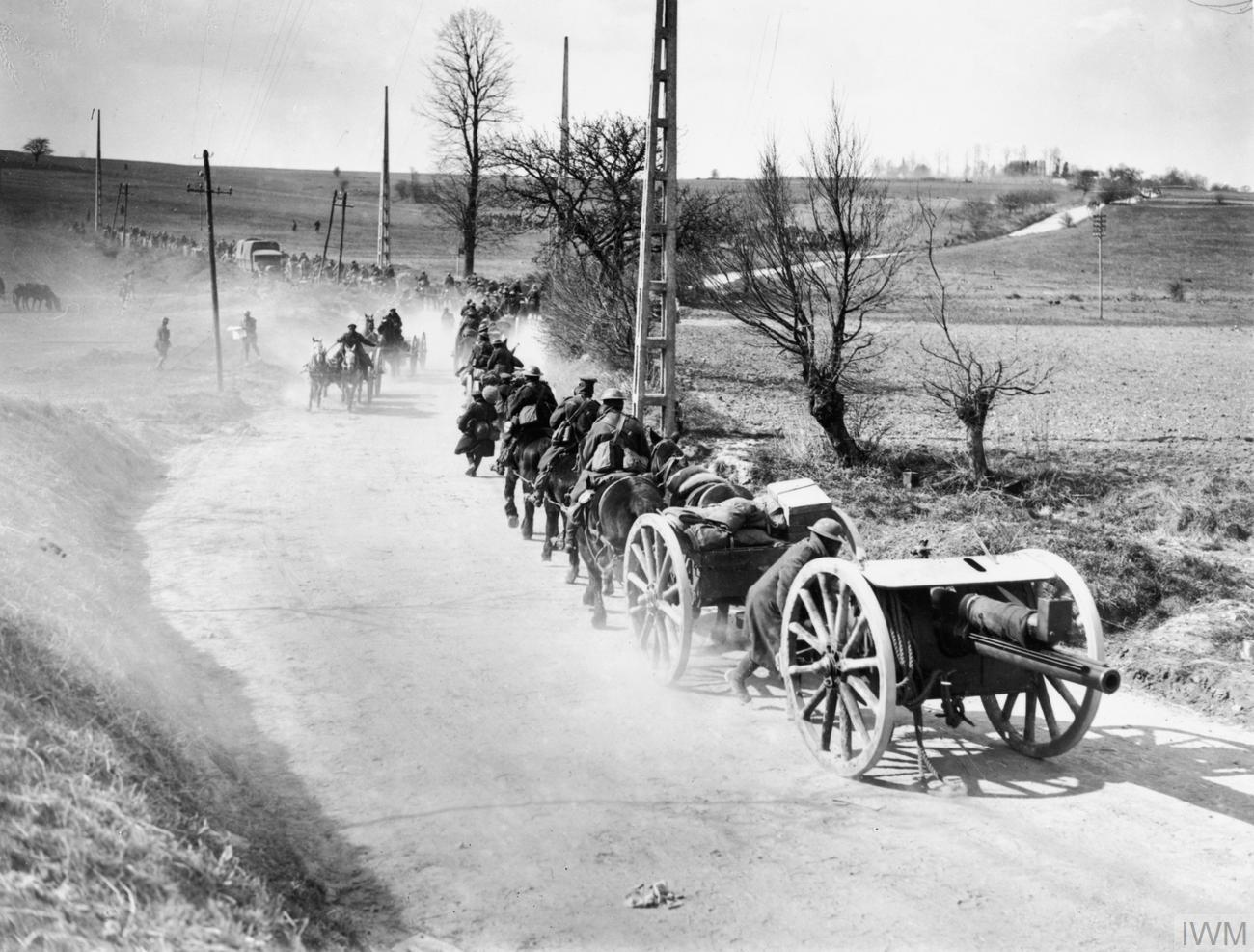
18-pounder battery moving up during the Spring Offensive

The opening bombardment of the German spring offensive on 21 March 1918 found 39th Division in reserve. The units and formations in Fifth Army's Forward Zone were overwhelmed in the first hours and the reserves were sent up before the end of the day: 39th Division went to assist the hard-pressed 16th (Irish) Division, with 39th DA racing up to help. Next day the Germans continued to advance and at 08.15 16th (Irish) Division was ordered to retire, covered by the guns of 39th DA. At 09.00 CLXXIV Bde was also ordered to withdraw, but with the exception of D (H) Bty they were unable to get limbers up to the gun positions, and therefore remained in action until the infantry had withdrawn past them, firing at whatever targets they could see. Eventually, with the enemy working round both flanks and harassed with machine gun fire, the detachments withdrew, taking their breech blocks and sights, having to abandon 16 18-pdrs. Having withdrawn, D Bty brought its howitzers back into action and continued to fire on the advancing enemy troops. Two remaining 18-pdrs of C Bty had been in the workshops, and these were brought into action in a fresh position alongside guns and howitzers of another brigade. Meanwhile, CLXXXVI Bde's limbers had been closer, and the brigade was able to withdraw, having remained in action until the enemy infantry were within 300 yards (270 m).

39th and 16th Divisions fought on throughout 23 March as they retired towards the River Somme, the field brigades withdrawing to new positions from time to time as they covered the infantry, inflicting serious casualties on the Germans. One gun of C/CLXXXVI was destroyed by a shell, but five stray guns of another brigade attached themselves, and men from CLXXIV Bde helped to man the guns of a heavy battery supporting 39th Division. CCLXXXII Army Field Artillery Bde distinguished itself in support of 39th Division on 23 March, firing on the advancing Germans until the last moment before pulling out. 39th Division and the guns then crossed the Somme before the bridges were blown up.

For the next two days the British fought to defend the Somme Crossings. The 'batteries took full advantage of the many opportunities offered in engaging the advancing enemy with observed fire, and one section of A/186 did particularly good work over open sights'. The batteries fired an average of 3000 rounds each on 24 March, and continued firing during the night. The Germans were less visible on 25 March, but all possible crossing places were kept under constant fire overnight. However, the line of the Somme had been turned by the Germans and the retreat was resumed, with covering fire from the field guns. Some reorganisation was achieved: Brig-Gen W.G. Thompson took over as CRA, and the heavy battery returned to its group.

The Germans made a major effort on 27 March (the Battle of Rosières). 39th Divisional Artillery had XLVI Bde of 14th (Light) Division and a battery of CCLXXXII AFA Bde also under command, but could only assemble 53 guns. The artillery engaged the attackers with observed and barrage fire, but the right flank having been pushed back, CLXXXVI Bde had to retire again, after inflicting considerable losses to the enemy over open sights. Several successful local counter-attacks were made during the afternoon with artillery support. Next day 39th DA gave supporting fire to 'Carey's Force' – the remnants of several shattered units and engineer companies collected by Brig-Gen G.G.S. Carey. At 21.00 both field brigades reported that the infantry were withdrawing through their battery lines, but they continued to inflict punishment on the attackers before withdrawing themselves. On 29 March Maj-Gen E. Feetham, commanding 39th Division was killed, and Brig-Gen Thompson took temporary command while Lt-Col Brooke resumed command of 39th DA.

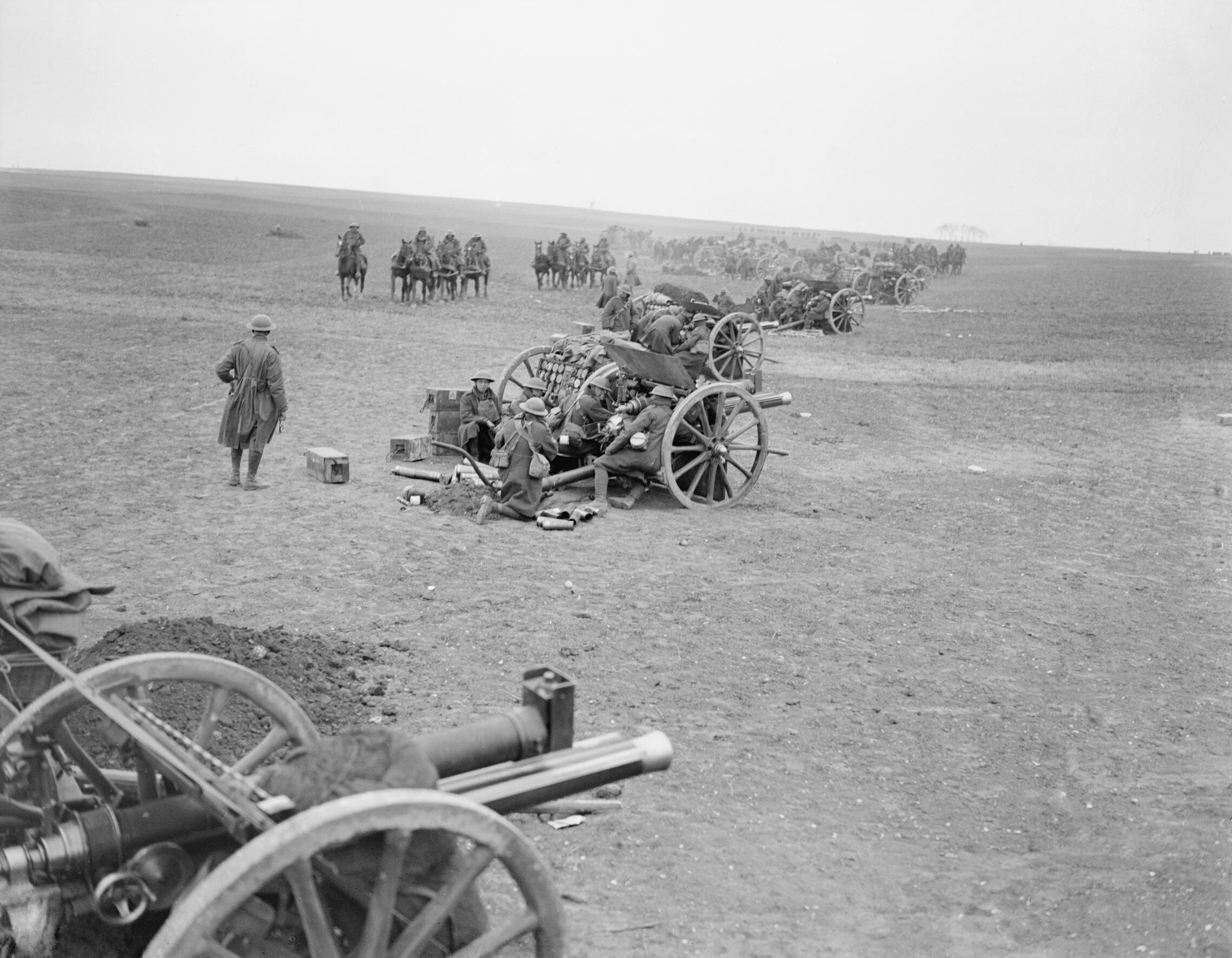
18-pounder battery in action in the open during the Spring Offensive.

There was now a lull in the fighting. The badly depleted infantry of 39th Division were relieved and sent north to the Ypres area, but 39th DA remained in the line as an independent formation comprising both field brigades, the two TM batteries, the DAC, No 1 Horse Transport Company of the Divisional Train (284 Company, Army Service Corps) and an ammunition section of 39th Division Motor Transport Company (495 Company, ASC). These formed a sub-group under 16th (Irish) DA, along with CCLXXVII AFA Bde (including the former A/CLXXIX (Deptford) Bty), all supporting 14th (Light) Division. The Germans began a new phase of their offensive on 4 April (the Battle of the Avre), starting with a violent bombardment in the early hours. The initial bombardment fell behind the artillery, but the Germans shortened the range as the attack started and they began shelling the battery positions with high explosive (HE) and gas. Casualties were heavy and the signallers were constantly engaged in trying to repair broken telephone lines, but visual signalling was used once the mist cleared. The Germans broke through the front line, but the CRA of 14th (L) Division ordered the guns to stand firm and stop the waves of German infantry with artillery fire alone. Apart from B/CLXXXVI, which was driven behind the crest by the intensity of fire, the batteries were pushed forward boldly to the crests and remained in position until nightfall, bringing attacks to a standstill with their shrapnel fire. A forward section of C/CLXXIV Bty was overrun, but the two guns were recovered after dark. During this action 39th DA lost three officers, 70 other ranks and 110 horses.

This attack must and can be stopped by artillery fire. If any battery can no longer effectively stop the enemy from its present position, it will at once move fighting to a position on the crest, to engage the enemy over open sights. It is essential that the artillery should hold the line and they will do so – Brig-Gen E. Harding-Newman, CRA 14th (Light) Division

Some say that the action of this day by the guns was one of the finest artillery stories of the whole War – Gen Sir MartinFarndale, RA historian

39th Divisional Artillery withdrew to new positions during the night, but the Germans did not resume their attack next day. Instead, both brigades moved forwards on 6 April to support an attack the following day by 9th Australian Brigade (the First Battle of Villers-Bretonneux), in which the gunners caused considerable casualties and captured 150 prisoners. After the brief respite at Villers-Bretonneux, 39th DA came under renewed heavy bombardment on 8, 9 and 11 April, breaking up German attacks with observed fire. When the units were brought out of the line at dusk on 13 April – claiming to be among the last who had fought on 21 March to be relieved – they had lost 330 men of all ranks and 250 horses. During the retreat the DAC had dumped shells at likely points where the guns would need them (100,000 rounds between 21 March and 1 April alone), and its small arms ammunition (SAA) section had supplied any nearby infantry unit that needed replenishment.

=== Summer 1918 ===
39th Divisional Artillery moved to the Amiens area for refitting; it did not rejoin 39th Division, whose depleted infantry had formed a single composite brigade that was fighting in the Battle of the Lys further north. These infantry units were later reduced to training cadres for the US Army formations arriving in France and took no further part in the fighting. However, 39th DA remained active on the Western Front for the rest of the war, operating under the command of other formations.

The batteries went back into the line on 1 May, and the TMBs carried out special demonstrations with mobile 6-inch mortars. On 15 May the two remaining TMBs were disbanded, apart from a special detachment with the mobile mortars, and the men were distributed to the two gun brigades and Third Army Reinforcement Camp. With no linked infantry to supply, the SAA section of the DAC was also disbanded. During June 39 DA rotated between spells in the line, exchanging harassing fire with the enemy opposite, and periods in reserve. On 3 July the units were transferred by rail to reserve positions behind Ypres, subsequently taking their turn in the line under various formations of Second Army.

=== Hundred Days' Offensive ===
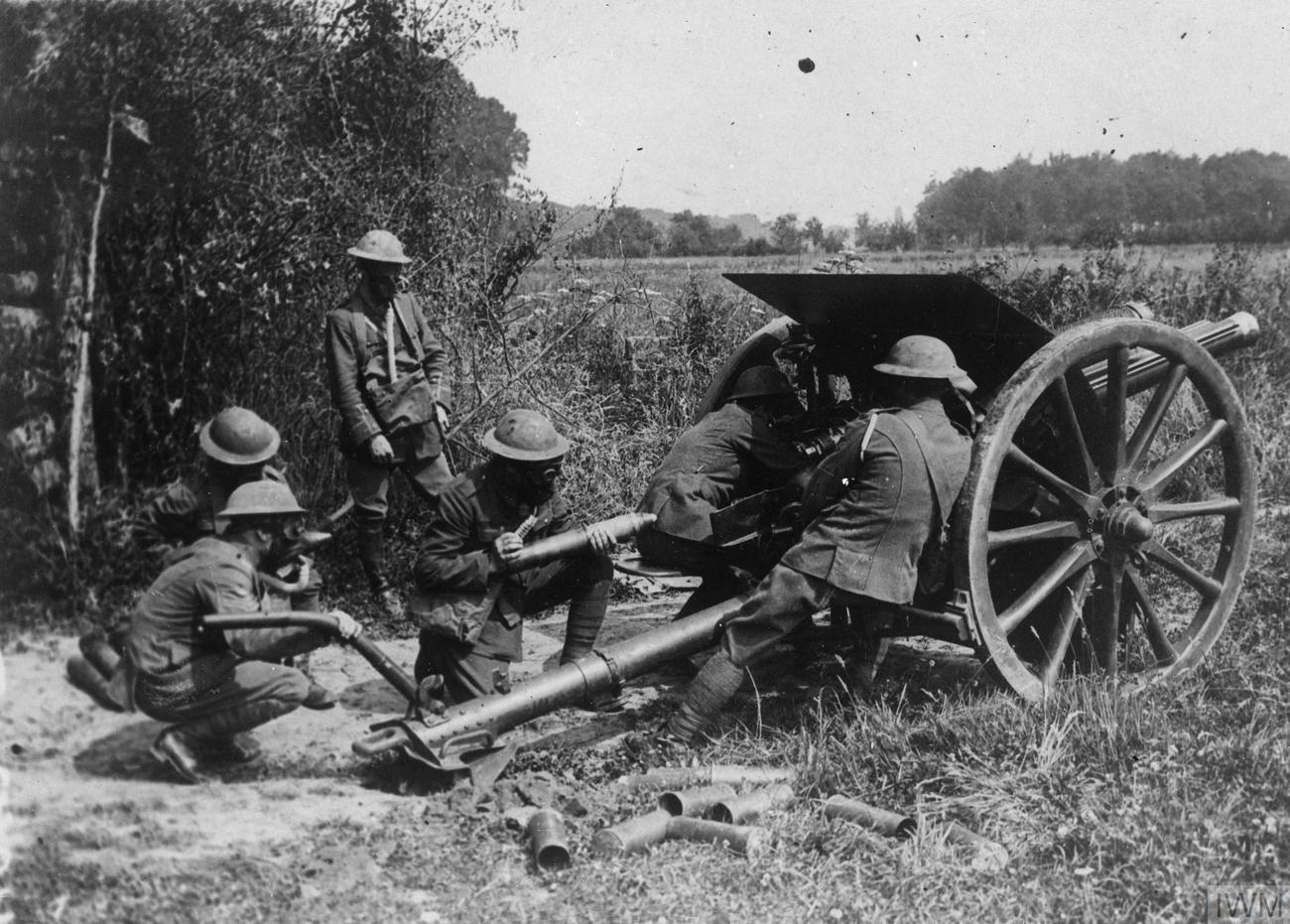
Gunners wearing Small box respirators firing an 18-pounder, August 1918.

On 22 August 39th DA began moving south by rail to join First Army in the Arras area and on 25 August it was placed under Canadian Corps for the Battle of the Scarpe. The guns were pre-positioned on 24/25 August, then the detachments moved up late on 25 August. The following day's assault was made at 03.00 behind an 'excellent' creeping barrage of 18-pdrs with the 4.5inch howitzers firing 200 yards (180 m) in front. The attack was successful, and the guns moved up in close support on 26 and 27 August. On 27 August Lt-Col Lord Alfred Browne commanding CLXXXVI Bde was killed in action. The Canadians advanced behind another creeping barrage on 28 August, and the guns continued to follow in support on 29 and 30 August, breaking up several counter-attacks. The forward movement continued in early September (the Battle of the Drocourt-Quéant Switch Line), with most batteries providing a section ready to take on any fleeting target that presented itself.

After breaching the 'D–Q Line', Canadian Corps advanced against weak opposition towards the Canal du Nord. This defensive position required a full-scale attack, which was carried out on 27 September. Both brigades of 39th DA supported the attack, the creeping barrage consisting of 50 per cent shrapnel, 40 per cent HE and 10 percent smoke shell; as well as screening the attackers the smoke blew towards the enemy and restricted his observation. The batteries advanced as the infantry progressed through their objectives and the Canadian engineers bridged the canal. The advance continued on 28 September with the field guns providing creeping barrages at short notice as required. On 1 October two brigades of 1st Canadian Division attacked a group of villages under a barrage fired by six field brigades including the two of 39th DA, but the enemy held the Abancourt Ridge beyond and the villages could not be secured.

On 9 October 39 DA bombarded the area around Cambrai as Canadian Corps made a demonstration in support of Third Army's attack (the Second Battle of Cambrai) and then advanced to the Sensée Canal against little opposition. First Army continued the pursuit towards the River Selle, where there was a pause on 19 October to prepare a set-piece attack.

During the Battle of the Selle 39th DA was among the mass of guns supporting 51st (Highland) Division in its attack over the Ecaillon river towards the Schelde Canal. Zero hour was 06.10, and even though some of the infantry lost the barrage the attack went well: by 10.30 the engineers had two bridges over the Ecaillon for the field artillery to cross. The brigades were withdrawn into reserve on 25 October, but on 30 October they moved into action again and next day fired in support of the Canadians' assault at Valenciennes. Supplies had to come 10 miles (16 km) up a single bad road, but sufficient ammunition was brought up and the attack on 1 November succeeded despite some stout resistance (the guns were forbidden to shell the town itself, in which French civilians were sheltering). The Canadians liberated Valenciennes on 3 November.

On 4 November 39 DA was transferred to VIII Corps and went into First Army Reserve, where it remained until the Armistice with Germany entered force on 11 November. Demobilisation began in 1919 and 39th DA and its constituent units were disbanded.

=== Commanders ===
The following officers commanded 39th Divisional Artillery and its units during the war:

CRA

- Brig-Gen C.E. Goulburn, appointed 21 September 1915, to 26 February 1916
- Brig-Gen R.W. Fuller, 26 February to 24 March 1916
- Brig-Gen G. Gillson, 24 March 1916 to 11 October 1917
- Lt-Col C.H. Kilner, acting 11 to 18 October 1917
- Brig-Gen G.A.S. Cape from 18 October 1917, killed 18 March 1918 while acting divisional commander
- Lt-Col E.W.S. Brooke, acting 18 to 26 and 29 March 1918
- Brig-Gen W.G.H. Thompson, 26 to 29 March, and from 30 March 1918 to demobilisation

CLXXIV (Deptford) Bde

- Lt-Col E.R. Phillips, 19 May 1915 to 11 April 1916
- Lt-Col J.G.B. Allardyce, 11 April 1916 to 17 December 1917
- Lt-Col E.W.S. Brooke, 18 December 1917 to 1 April 1918
- Lt-Col F.E. Spencer, 1 April 1918 to demobilisation

CLXXIX (Deptford) Bde

- Col D. Fulton, 3 June 1915 to 5 January 1916
- Lt-Col A.M. Kennard, DSO, 5 January to 11 August 1916
- Col A. Hardley-Wright, 11 August 1916 to disbandment

CLXXXIV (Deptford) Bde

- Lt-Col C.M. Rudkin, from 20 July 1915 to disbandment

CLXXXVI (Deptford) Howitzer Bde

- Col R. Oakes, 21 August to 10 December 1915
- Lt-Col C.H. Kilner, 10 December 1915 to 30 November 1917
- Lt-Col G.S. Henderson, 30 November to 12 December 1917
- Lt-Col Lord Alfred Browne, DSO, from 12 December 1917, killed 27 August 1918
- Lt-Col R.C. Reeves, 1 September 1918 to demobilisation

39th (Deptford) DAC

- Lt-Col A.E.S. Griffin, 26 August 1915 to 10 August 1916
- Col A.H. Carter, CMG, 11 August 1916 to 11 October 1918
- Col F.W. Boteler, 13 October 1918 to demobilisation

DTMO

- Capt O.C.K. Corrie, North Somerset Yeomanry, 25 April 1916 to 1 June 1917
- Capt T. Mulligan, from 1 June 1917 to disbandment

== 137th (Deptford) Heavy Battery, RGA ==
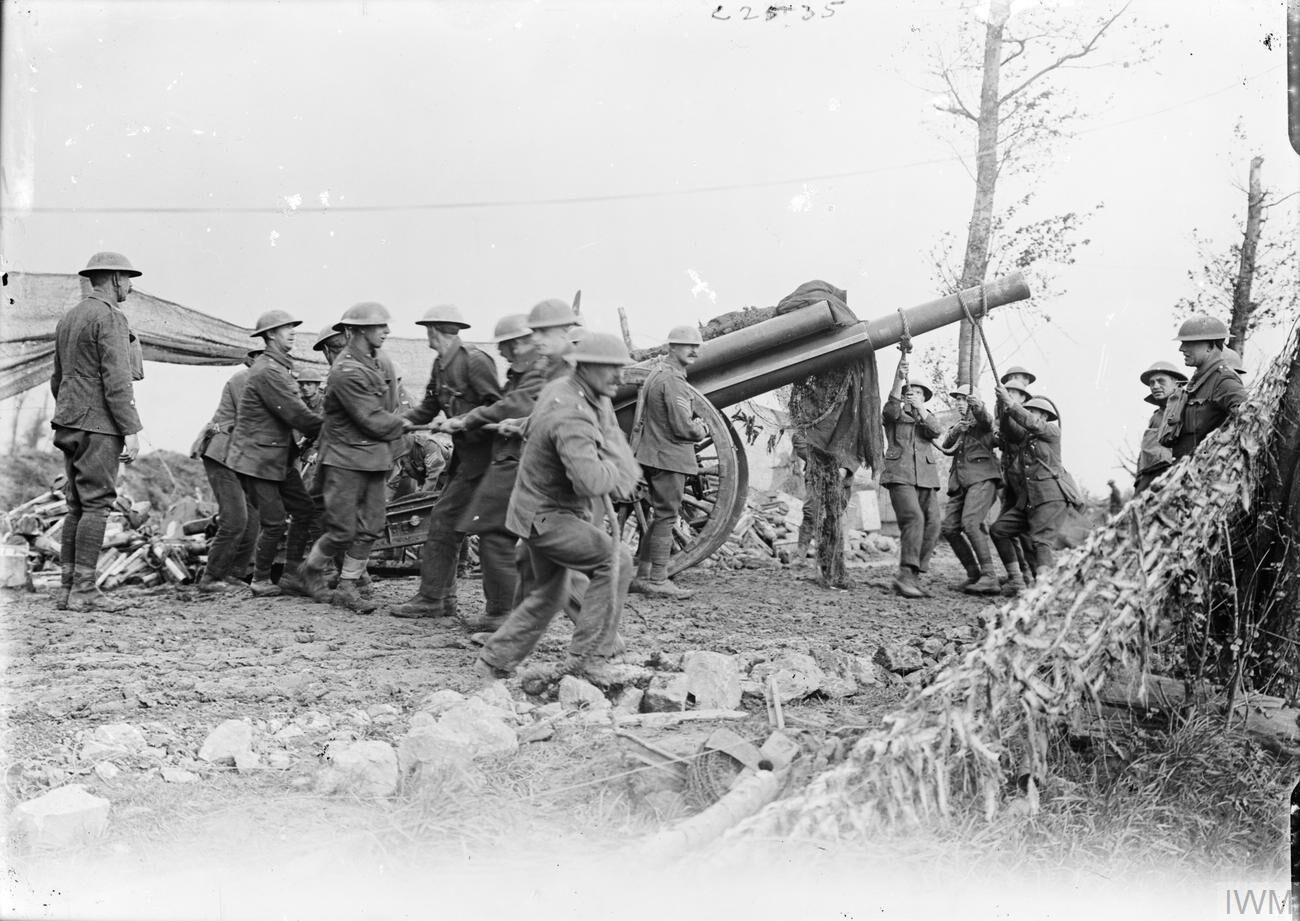
Moving a 60-pounder gun out of its emplacement, 1917.

137th (Deptford) Heavy Battery and its ammunition column were raised at Deptford as part of 39th Divisional Artillery in August 1915. It was taken over by the military authorities on 17 January 1916. By the time 39th Division embarked for France, the policy was to remove heavy batteries from infantry divisions and concentrate them into heavy artillery groups (HAGs). 137th Heavy Bty, equipped with four 60-pounder guns, went out to the Western Front in April 1916, joined I ANZAC Corps Heavy Artillery on 27 April but transferred to III Corps HA the next day. It was assigned to 22nd HAG with Fourth Army on 3 May, then to 34th HAG with Second Army on 9 June, and therefore missed the Battle of the Somme. However, because Second Army held the Ypres Salient, low-level trench warfare was constant.

=== Vimy Ridge ===
137th (Deptford) Hvy Bty was made up to six guns on 9 November 1916 when it was joined by a section from 173rd Heavy Bty, formed at Woolwich on 8 May 1916, which had just landed in France. (Note: The other two sections of 173rd Heavy Bty were assigned to 150th (Rotherham) and 155th (East Cheshire) Heavy Btys.) The battery was sent to 21st HAG with Fourth Army on 17 March 1917, but transferred to 15th HAG with First Army four days later. This HAG was assigned to I Corps and situated behind Aix-Noulette as a counter-battery (CB) group for the Battle of Vimy Ridge. First Army's commander, Gen Henry Horne, was himself a gunner and took a personal interest in the artillery preparation. The dedicated CB groups were provided with observation aircraft (the BE 2's of No 2 Squadron, Royal Flying Corps with I Corps), flash-spotters and sound-rangers, as well as their own Forward Observation Officers (FOOs). After the battle it was established that 86 per cent of the 212 active German batteries had been accurately located, despite bad weather and the new period of German air superiority (known to the RFC as Bloody April). The CB batteries began their systematic fire programmes on 20 March, 20 days before the attack (Z minus 20), beginning with destructive fire aimed at isolated German batteries, leaving the 'nests' of grouped batteries to be neutralised later by HE and gas shelling. From Z minus 10 the CB groups switched to more vigorous destruction of all known enemy batteries, telephone exchanges and observation posts. The huge weight of artillery, including 'some of the most accurate counter-battery fire of the war', together with the dash of the attacking troops ensured the success of the attack when it was launched on 9 April.

After the initial success at Vimy, the Arras Offensive broke down into costly trench warfare. First Army was engaged in several actions though April and May 1917. 137th (Deptford) Hvy Bty transferred to 67th HAG on 14 May, but returned to 15th on 4 July as First Army improved its positions around Oppy Wood and Souchez. Later, while much of the BEF was engaged in the Third Ypres Offensive, I Corps and Canadian Corps fought the Battle of Hill 70 north of Lens. For this operation 15th HAG supported the Canadians with CB fire beginning in mid-July, although the attack was postponed until 15 August, by which time only 63 of the 102 identified German batteries were still active. The assault was successful, but several counter-attacks had to be beaten back, and fighting went on until 25 August.

=== Passchendaele ===
The Canadian Corps was due to be moved north to join Second Army in the Ypres offensive and on 6 October the battery was transferred to 2nd Canadian HAG. The Corps went into the line between 14 and 21 October for the Second Battle of Passchendaele. Second Army's autumn attacks at the Menin Road, Polygon Wood and Broodseinde (see above) had been highly successful because of the weight of artillery brought to bear on German positions. But as the offensive continued into the winter the tables were turned: British batteries were clearly observable from the Passchendaele Ridge and were subjected to CB fire, while their own guns sank into the mud and became difficult to aim and fire. The Canadians attacked on 26 October with ground conditions that became increasingly bad as rain fell; they made no more than 500 yards (460 m), the other attacking troops even less. The battery transferred to 42nd HAG with the neighbouring Fifth Army on 30 October for the second phase of the battle, but little more was achieved before the fighting ended on 10 November.

On 19 December 137th Hvy Bty battery was ordered to 51st HAG, which it joined on 15 December, remaining with it for the rest of the war. This HAG was with Fourth Amy (which was taking over the Ypres sector from Second Army HQ).

=== Spring Offensive ===
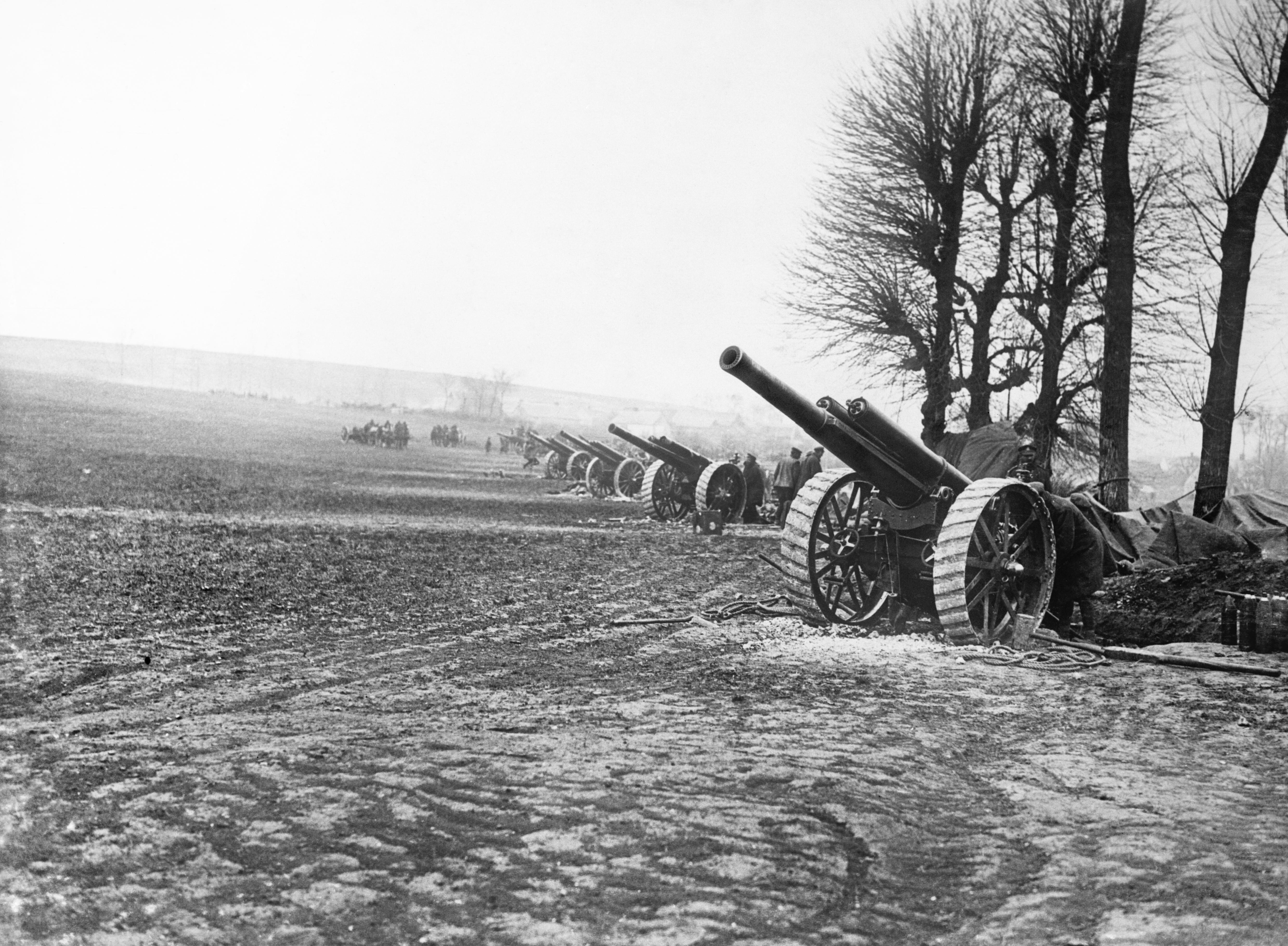
60-pounders deployed in the open during the German Spring Offensive.

The HAG became permanent RGA brigades on 1 February 1918, with 51st being designated a 'Mixed' brigade consisting of two batteries of 60-pdrs (137th (Deptford) and 138th (Hampstead)) and four heavy howitzer batteries of various calibres. 51st Brigade moved back to Fifth Army in March.

137th Hvy Bty was supporting III Corps when the German Spring Offensive fell on it on 21 March. Here the British line was at its thinnest and the fog at its thickest. The battery's FOO, Lt L.P.G. Bremner, remained in his OP near Urvillers, just south of St Quentin, despite his telephone line being cut by enemy shellfire. After the British Forward Zone had been overrun, the German barrage began to advance again about 10.30. Bremner watched small balloons flying above the mist, marking the positions of the advancing German infantry, until they got within 200 yards (180 m) of his OP, when he destroyed his papers and made his way back. Meanwhile 138th Hvy Bty also lost communication with its OP in Fort Vendeuil and fired its 60 pdrs blind until the mist cleared about midday, when it could engage the captured strongpoint.

A number of RGA units were either caught in the fighting or forced to abandon their guns as the Germans advanced rapidly. Others struggled to get their guns back during the 'Great Retreat' Fourth Army HQ took over all of Fifth Army's formations and units on 2 April, and the first phase of the German offensive was halted on 4 April. Further attacks came on other parts of the front, but none broke through completely. 51st Bde formally came under Fourth Army again on 1 May and stayed with it until the end of the war.

=== Hundred Days ===
Fourth Army launched the Allied Hundred Days Offensive on 8 August with the Battle of Amiens. The battered divisions of III Corps only had modest objectives, but despite excellent artillery support and CB fire they still made little progress, so on 10 August part of its front including 51st Bde was transferred to Australian Corps. During August and September Fourth Army continued advancing, with a series of successful attacks at Albert, Bapaume, Épehy, and the St Quentin Canal, all with massive artillery support. By mid-October the front had reverted to a war of movement, with a great deal of forest fighting in which the 60-pdrs were used to 'search' roads, tracks and clearings in the woods.

For the Battle of the Selle on 23 October, 51st Bde and its batteries were part of the huge artillery support for IX Corps. However, bad weather had prevented much air observation in the days leading up to the battle, and few of the enemy gun batteries had been located, so CB fire was hindered. Nevertheless, the attacking divisions had made good progress by the end of the day. Once the Selle and the Sambre had been crossed and the BEF began pursuing the enemy, the heavy artillery played a smaller part, its guns and ammunition generally left behind until roads and bridges could be repaired.

Postwar, 137th (Deptford) Heavy Bty was due to become B Bty in a consolidated 62nd Bde RGA, but this order was rescinded after the Treaty of Versailles and the battery was disbanded.

== Memorials ==
A parish Roll of Honour on oak boards was installed in St Luke's Church, Deptford, in October 1917, when it was unveiled by Mayor William Wayland.

A large wooden memorial board was placed in Deptford Town Hall in March 1921; the first panel was in memory of the men from Deptford who died in World War I, the second panel read: 'This panel commemorates the raising of the 174th, 179th, 184th, and 186th Brigades of the Royal Field Artillery, the 137th Battery of the Royal Garrison Artillery, and the 39th Divisional Ammunition Column, a total of 4700 men, by the Mayor, Sir William Wayland, for service in the Great War'.

== External sources ==
- Commonwealth War Graves Commission records
- Imperial War Museum, War Memorials Register
- London Borough of Lewisham in the First World War
- The Long, Long Trail
- World War I East Sussex
