= List of battalions of the Argyll and Sutherland Highlanders (Princess Louise's) =

This is a list of battalions of the Argyll and Sutherland Highlanders (Princess Louise's), which existed as an infantry regiment of the British Army from 1881 to 2006.

== Original composition ==
When the 91st (Argyllshire Highlanders) Regiment of Foot amalgamated with the 93rd (Sutherland Highlanders) Regiment of Foot, to become Princess Louise's (Sutherland and Argyll Highlanders) in 1881 under the Cardwell-Childers reforms of the British Armed Forces, nine pre-existent militia and volunteer battalions of Argyllshire, Buteshire, Dunbartonshire, Kinross-shire, Renfrewshire, and Stirlingshire were integrated into the structure of the regiment. Volunteer battalions had been created in reaction to a perceived threat of invasion by France in the late 1850s. Organised as "rifle volunteer corps", they were independent of the British Army and composed primarily of the middle class.

Battalion	Formed	Formerly
Regular
1st	1881	1st Battalion, 91st Highlanders
2nd	1881	1st Battalion, 93rd Highlanders
Militia
3rd (Militia)	1797	Highland Borderers Light Infantry Militia
4th (Militia)	1793	The Prince of Wales's Royal Renfrew Militia
Volunteers
1st (Renfrewshire) Volunteer	1860	1st Renfrewshire Rifle Volunteers
2nd (Renfrewshire) Volunteer	1860	2nd Renfrewshire Rifle Volunteers
3rd (Renfrewshire) Volunteer	1860	3rd Renfrewshire Rifle Volunteers
4th (Stirlingshire) Volunteer	1860	1st Stirlingshire Rifle Volunteers
5th Volunteer	1861	1st Argyllshire Highland Rifle Volunteers
1st Dunbartonshire Rifle Volunteers (6th VB)	1860	
7th (Clackmannan and Kinross) Volunteer	1867	1st Clackmannan and Kinross Rifle Volunteers

== Reorganisation ==
The Territorial Force (later Territorial Army) was formed in 1908, which the volunteer battalions joined, while the militia battalions transferred to the "Special Reserve". All volunteer battalions were renumbered to create a single sequential order.

Battalion	Formerly
5th (Renfrewshire)	1st (Renfrewshire) Volunteer Battalion
6th (Renfrewshire)	2nd (Renfrewshire) Volunteer Battalion (on amalgamation with the 3rd (Renfrewshire) Volunteer Battalion)
7th	4th (Stirlingshire) Volunteer Battalion (on amalgamation with the 7th (Clackmannan and Kinross) Volunteer Battalion)
8th (The Argyllshire)	5th Volunteer Battalion
9th (Dunbartonshire)	1st Dunbartonshire Rifle Volunteer Corps

== First World War ==
The Argyll and Sutherland Highlanders fielded 27 battalions and lost over 6,900 officers and other ranks during the course of the war. The regiment's territorial components formed duplicate second and third line battalions. As an example, the battalions of the 5th Argyll and Sutherland Highlanders were numbered as the 1/5th, 2/5th, and 3/5th respectively, with the 3rd line battalion becoming reserve battalions later on in the war. The Volunteer Training Corps were raised with overage or reserved occupation men early in the war, and were initially self-organised into many small corps, with a wide variety of names. Recognition of the corps by the authorities brought regulation and as the war continued the small corps were formed into battalion sized units of the county Volunteer Regiment. In 1918 these were linked to county regiments.

Battalion	Formed	Served	Fate
Regular
1st	1881	Salonika	
2nd	1881	Boulogne, as Line of communication troops	
Special Reserve
3rd (Reserve)	1797	Britain, Ireland	
4th (Extra Reserve)	1793	Britain	
Territorial Force
1/5th (Renfrewshire)	1860	Gallipoli, Western Front	See Inter-War
1/6th (Renfrewshire)	1908	Western Front	See Inter-War
1/7th	1908	Western Front	
1/8th (The Argyllshire)	1861	Western Front	
1/9th (The Dunbartonshire)	1860	Western Front	See Inter-War
2/5th (Renfrewshire)	Greenock, September 1914	Britain	Absorbed by 2/8th (The Argyllshire) Battalion on 30 November 1915
2/6th (Renfrewshire)	Paisley, September 1914	Britain	Disbanded on 13 March 1918
2/7th	Stirling, September 1914	Britain	Disbanded in Autumn 1917
2/8th (The Argyllshire)	Dunoon, September 1914	Britain	Disbanded on 19 July 1918
2/9th (The Dunbartonshire)	Dumbarton, September 1914	Britain	Disbanded in October 1917
3/5th (Renfrewshire), 5th (Renfrewshire) (Reserve) from 8 April 1916	April 1915	Britain	Disbanded in 1919
3/6th (Renfrewshire), 6th (Renfrewshire) (Reserve) from 8 April 1916	April 1915	Britain	Absorbed by 5th (Renfrewshire) (Reserve) Battalion on 1 September 1916
3/7th (Renfrewshire), 7th (Reserve) from 8 April 1916	April 1915	Britain	Absorbed by 5th (Renfrewshire) (Reserve) Battalion on 1 September 1916
3/8th (The Argyllshire), 8th (Reserve) from 8 April 1916	April 1915	Britain	Absorbed by 5th (Renfrewshire) (Reserve) Battalion on 1 September 1916
3/9th (The Dunbartonshire), 9th (The Dunbartonshire) (Reserve) from 8 April 1916	April 1915	Britain	Absorbed by 5th (Renfrewshire) (Reserve) Battalion on 1 September 1916
16th	1 January 1917	Britain	Disbanded 1919
New Army
10th (Service)	Stirling, August 1914	Western Front	Disbanded 1919
11th (Service)	Stirling, September 1914	Western Front	Disbanded 26 August 1918
12th (Service)	Stirling, August 1914	Salonika	Disbanded 1920
13th (Service), 13th (Reserve) from 10 April 1915	Blackheath, November 1914	Western Front	Became the 41st Training Reserve Battalion, 9th Reserve Brigade on 1 September 1916
14th (Service)	Stirling, early 1915	Western Front	Disbanded 1919
15th (Reserve)	Gailes, November 1915	Britain	Absorbed into the Training Reserve Battalions, 9th Reserve Brigade
17th	Deal, 1 June 1918	Britain	Absorbed into 14th (Service) Battalion in 1918
Volunteer Training Corps
1st Battalion Argyllshire Volunteer Regiment		Dunoon	Disbanded post war
1st Battalion Dunbartonshire Volunteer Regiment		Helensbrugh	Disbanded post war
2nd Battalion Dunbartonshire Volunteer Regiment		Kirkintilloch, Glasgow	Disbanded post war
1st Battalion Kinross-shire Volunteer Regiment		Kinross	Disbanded post war
1/1st Battalion Renfrewshire Volunteer Regiment		Paisley	Disbanded post war
2/1st Battalion Renfrewshire Volunteer Regiment		Greenock	Disbanded post war
1st Battalion Stirlingshire Volunteer Regiment		Stirling	Disbanded post war

== Between the wars ==
By 1921, all of the regiment's war-raised battalions had disbanded. The Argyll and Sutherland Highlanders did not, however, return to its original peacetime size; two of its territorial battalions were amalgamated shortly after the war ended. The Special Reserve reverted to its militia designation in 1921, then to the Supplementary Reserve in 1924; however, its battalions were effectively placed in 'suspended animation'. As World War II approached, the Territorial Army was reorganised in the mid-1930s and many of its infantry battalions were converted to other roles, especially anti-aircraft.

Battalion	Fate
5th (Renfrewshire)	Amalgamated with the 6th (Renfrewshire) Battalion, to form 5th/6th (Renfrewshire) Battalion in 1921
6th (Renfrewshire)	Amalgamated with the 5th (Renfrewshire) Battalion, to form 5th/6th (Renfrewshire) Battalion in 1921
9th	Transferred to the Royal Artillery, November 1938 and became 54th Light Anti-Aircraft Regiment, Royal Artillery

== Second World War ==
The regiment's expansion during the Second World War was modest compared to 1914–1918. National Defence Companies were combined to create a new "Home Defence" battalion, and in addition to this, three battalions of the Home Guard were affiliated to the regiment, wearing its cap badge.

Battalion	Formed	Served	Fate
Regular
1st	1881	North Africa, Crete, East Africa, Palestine, Italy	See Post-World War II
2nd	1881	Malaya, Singapore, France, Western Front	See Post-World War II
Supplementary Reserve
3rd	1797		See Post-World War II
4th	1793		See Post-World War II
Territorial Army
5th (Renfrewshire)	1939	France and Belgium	Transferred to the Royal Artillery, November 1941 and became 91st Anti-Tank Regiment
6th	1939	France and Belgium	Transferred to the Royal Artillery, November 1941 and became 93rd Anti-Tank Regiment
7th	1908	France, North Africa, Sicily, Normandy, North West Europe	See Post-World War II
8th	1861	France, North Africa, Sicily, Italy	See Post-World War II
8th	1861	France, North Africa, Sicily, Italy	See Post-World War II
10th	1939	Britain	Reformed the 7th Battalion in 1940
11th (Argyll and Dumbarton)	1939	Britain	Reformed the 8th Battalion in 1940
12th (Home Defence)	November 1939	Britain	Redesignated as 30th Battalion in December 1941
13th (Home Defence)	December 1939	Britain	Absorbed into the 12th (Home Defence) Battalion, in August 1940
14th (Home Defence)	December 1939	Britain	Disbanded in October 1940
15th	May 1940, by redesignation of 50th (Holding) Battalion	Britain	Reconstituted as the 2nd Battalion, in 1942
30th	December 1941, by redesignation of 12th (Home Defence) Battalion	Britain	Disbanded in January 1943
Others
50th (Holding)	1940	Britain	Redesignated as 15th Battalion in May 1940
70th (Young Soldier)	September 1940	Britain	Disbanded 1942

Home Guard
Battalion	Headquarters	Formation Sign (dark blue on khaki)	Battalion	Headquarters	Formation Sign (dark blue on khaki)
1st	Oban	ARG 1	2nd	Dunoon	ARG 2
3rd	Campletown	ARG 3			

== Post-World War II ==
In the immediate post-war period, the army was significantly reduced: nearly all infantry regiments had their first and second battalions amalgamated and the Supplementary Reserve disbanded.

Battalion	Fate
1st	Amalgamated with 2nd Battalion on 30 September 1948
2nd	Amalgamated with 1st Battalion on 30 September 1948
3rd	Disbanded in 1953
4th	Disbanded in 1953
7th	Disbanded and concurrently amalgamated with the 8th Battalion on 1 April 1967
8th	Disbanded and concurrently amalgamated with the 7th Battalion on 1 April 1967

== Strategic Defence Review ==
Battalion	Fate
7th/8th	Amalgamated with 3rd (V) Battalion, The Black Watch; and 3rd (V) Battalion, The Highlanders to form the 51st Highland Regiment, on 1 July 1999

== Prior to amalgamation ==
The Argyll and Sutherland Highlanders, was amalgamated with the Royal Scots, King's Own Scottish Borderers, Royal Highland Fusiliers, Black Watch, and the Highlanders (Seaforth, Gordons and Camerons), to form the Royal Regiment of Scotland in 2006, under Delivering Security in a Changing World. The 1st battalion became the 5th Battalion, Royal Regiment of Scotland.
