= List of British Army formations during the Second Boer War =

This is a list of all British formations mobilised to serve in the Second Boer War

== Corps ==
Corps
Formation name	Created	Ceased to exist	Locations served	Notes	Ref
First Army Corps					

== Divisions ==
Divisions
Formation name	Created	Ceased to exist	Locations served	Notes	Ref
1st Division					
2nd Division					
3rd Division					
4th Division	March 1900	October 1900	Natal, Transvaal	Formed from garrison of Ladysmith after Siege	
5th Division	November 1899	October 1900	Natal, Transvaal		
6th Division					
7th Division					
8th Division					
9th Division					
10th Division					
11th Division					
Colonial Division					
Cavalry Division					
1st Mounted Division					
2nd Mounted Division					
3rd Mounted Division					
4th Mounted Division					
5th Mounted Division					

== Brigades ==
Brigades
Formation name	Created	Ceased to exist	Locations served	Notes	Ref
1st (Guards) Brigade				Existing brigade at Aldershot	
2nd Brigade				Existing brigade at Aldershot	
3rd (Highland) Brigade				Existing brigade at Aldershot	
4th (Light) Brigade				Existing brigade	
5th (Irish) Brigade				Existing brigade	
6th (Fusilier) Brigade				Existing brigade	
7th Brigade	March 1900	October 1900	Natal, Transvaal	Formed in the garrison of Ladysmith	
8th Brigade	March 1900	October 1900	Natal, Transvaal	Formed in the garrison of Ladysmith	
9th Brigade	November 1899			Formed from troops already in Cape Colony	
10th (Fusilier) Brigade	November 1899				
11th (Lancashire) Brigade	November 1899				
12th Brigade					
13th Brigade					
14th Brigade					
15th Brigade					
16th Brigade					
16th Brigade					
17th Brigade					
18th Brigade					
19th Brigade					
20th Brigade					
21st Brigade					
22nd Brigade					
23rd Brigade					
