= Battle of the Avre =

Battle during the First World War

- Part of Operation Michael (German spring offensive)
Date	4–5 April 1918
Location	The Avre, Amiens 49°53′00″N 02°20′25″E
Result	British victory

Belligerents
British Empire: Australia; United Kingdom of Great Britain and Ireland	German Empire

Commanders and leaders
	(German Empire) Erich Ludendorff

The Battle of the Avre (4–5 April 1918), part of the First Battle of Villers-Bretonneux, constituted the final German attack towards Amiens in World War I. It was the point at which the Germans got the closest to Amiens. It was fought between attacking German troops and defending Australian and British troops. The attack was an attempt to take Amiens, where other aspects of Operation Michael had failed. The Avre marked the beginning of the end for Ludendorf's German spring offensive.

== Prelude ==
Preliminary moves (29–30 March) across the southern battlefields by German 2nd Army proved so slow and difficult that offensive operations were suspended between 1–3 April to allow German forces to recover.

== Battle ==
=== 4 April ===
The final German attack was eventually launched towards Amiens. It came on 4 April, when fifteen divisions attacked seven Allied divisions on a line east of Amiens and north of Albert (towards the Avre River). Ludendorff decided to attack the outermost eastern defences of Amiens centred on the town of Villers-Bretonneux. His aim was to secure that town and the surrounding high ground from which artillery bombardments could systematically destroy Amiens and render it useless to the Allies. The subsequent fighting was remarkable on two counts: the first use of tanks simultaneously by both sides in the war, and the night-time counterattack hastily organized by the Australian and British units (including the exhausted 54th Brigade) which dramatically re-captured Villers-Bretonneux and halted the German onslaught.

From north to south, the line was held by British and Australian troops, specifically the British 14th (Light) Division and 18th (Eastern) Division, and the 35th Australian Battalion. Heavy rain was falling as the German bombardment began at 05.15. At 06.30 the assault was launched. The Australians held off the 9th Bavarian Reserve Division and the British 18th Division held off the German Guards Ersatz Division and 19th Divisions in the First Battle of Villers-Bretonneux.

14th Division came under heavy attack from the German 228th Division and fell back about 2 miles (3.2 km). Brigadier-General G.N.B Forster of 42nd Brigade remained at his headquarters and was killed. (Note: Brig-Gen Forster is commemorated on the Pozières Memorial.) But the German advance was then stopped dead by the artillery. 14th Division only had one brigade (XLVI Brigade, Royal Field Artillery), left of its own divisional artillery, but it was supported by the divisional artilleries of 16th (Irish) Division (CLXXVII and CLXXX Brigades, RFA) and 39th Division (CLXXIV and CLXXXVI Brigades with X/39 and Y/39 Medium Trench Mortar Batteries, RFA), together with CCLXXVII Army Field Artillery Brigade, RFA. All had already suffered losses in guns and personnel before 4 April. (Note: At full strength, RFA brigades were equipped with three batteries of six 18-pounder guns and one battery of six 4.5-inch howitzers. Medium trench mortar batteries were issued with six Newton 6-inch mortars.)

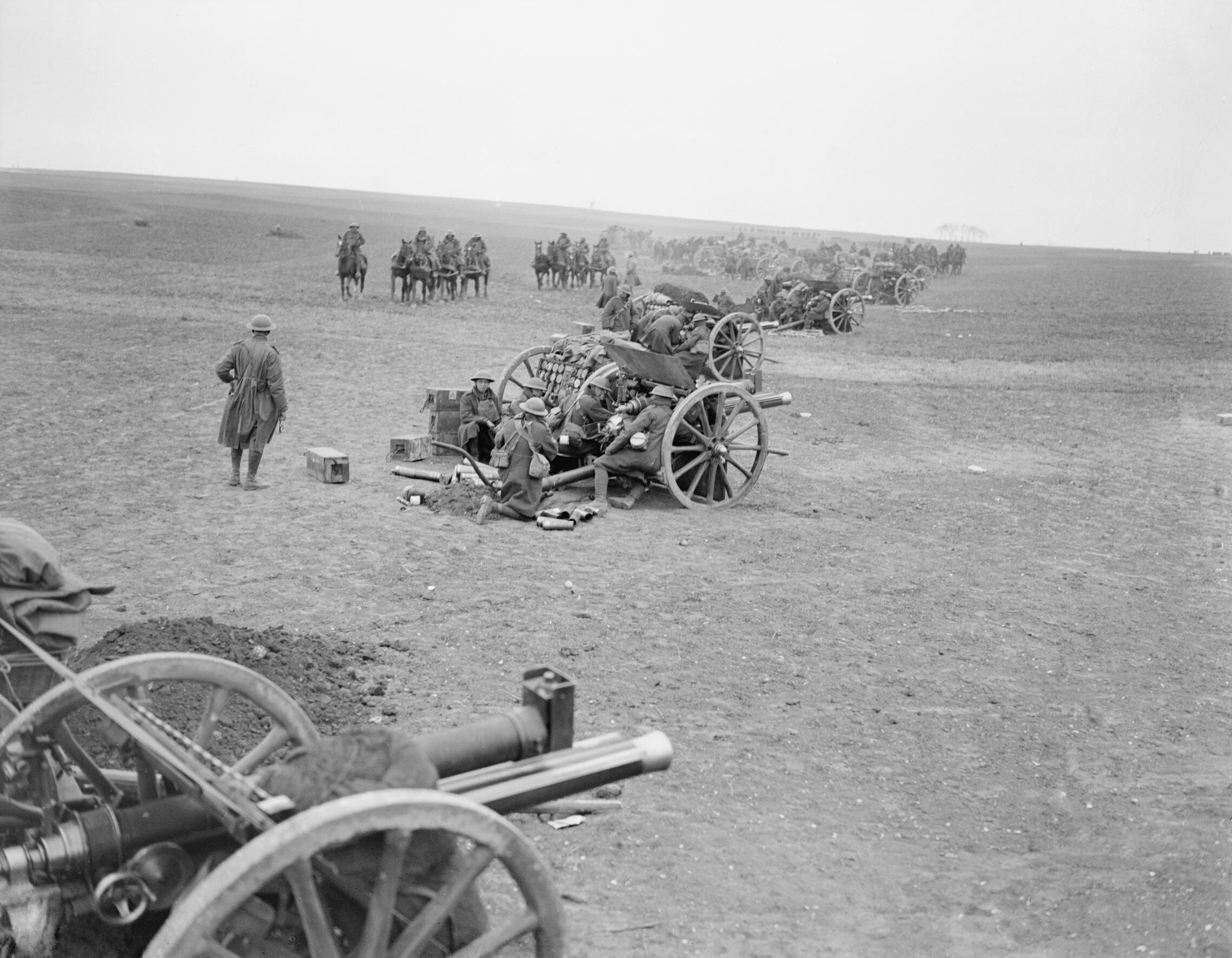
A battery of 18-pounders in action in the open during the German Spring Offensive.

All the batteries had been shelled heavily with high explosive and gas during the preliminary bombardment, and the Observation Posts (OPs) were blinded by mist. When the bombardment shifted to the infantry's front line trenches at 06.20, the field batteries responded by firing their pre-planned 'SOS' tasks blindly into the mist. Stragglers and wounded from the retreating infantry of 14th Division brought back alarming stories, but it was decided not to withdraw the guns. C and D Batteries of CLXXVII Bde saw German infantry in the mist, caught them in enfilade and broke them up. C Battery slowly turned as the Germans passed, eventually firing into their rear, and contributed significantly to breaking up the attack.

About 11.00 the mist began to clear and the OPs called down shrapnel fire on the massed German infantry with devastating effects. But they still came on in waves, and Brigadier-General E. Harding-Newman, Commander, Royal Artillery (CRA), of 14th Division, issued the order that 'This attack can and must be stopped by artillery fire. If any battery can no longer effectively stop the enemy from its present position, it will at once move fighting to a position on the crest, to engage the enemy over open sights. It is essential that the artillery should hold the line and they will do so'.

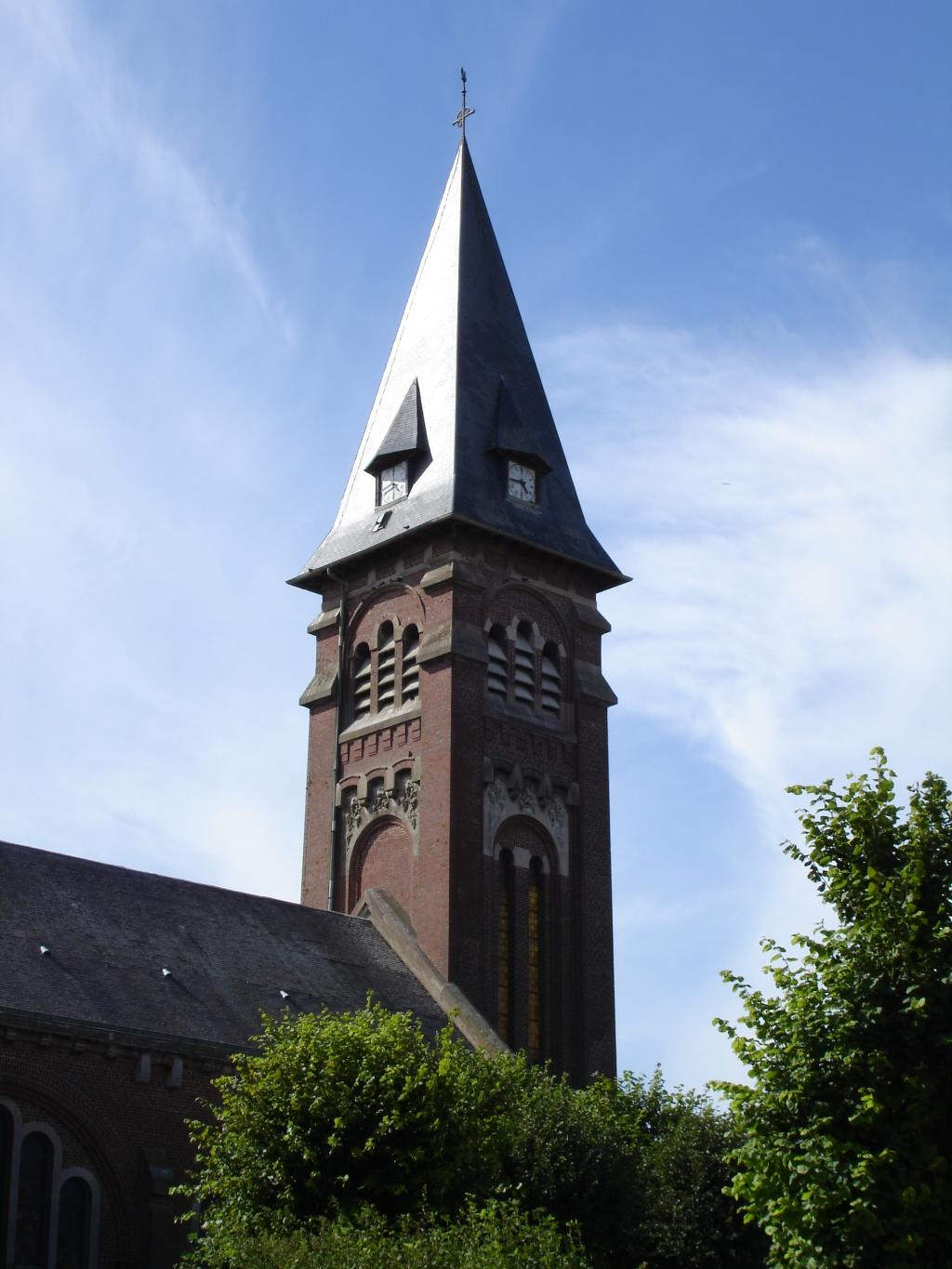
The modern clock tower of Le Hamel church.

CLXXVII Brigade established a new OP in the spire of Hamel church, from which they reported on the enemy for the rest of the day. Signallers kept OP telephone lines open under fire while the Forward Observation Officers brought down concentrated fire from the brigades that halted attack after attack. At several points guns were run forward to engage the enemy over Open sights. One gun of C Bty, CCLXXVII AFA Bde 'stood in the open for two hours with no pause in its firing, and lived to tell the tale. D Battery of the same Brigade smothered attack after attack with a pile of lethal gas shell which it found dumped'. (Note: D(H)/CCLXXVII was a howitzer battery.)

Although B/CLXXXVI Bty came under such withering fire from rifles, machine guns and artillery that it had to withdraw behind the crest, B/CLXXVII Bty ran its guns up to the crest at 13.00 to engage masses of enemy troops on the high ground east of Hamel. The battery commander poured 90 rounds per gun into this target to clear them away. (This battery had lost all but six of its gunners in action only a few days before, but had rushed men up from the wagon lines to replace them.)

Casualties among the gunners were serious: A/CLXXX Bty was in an open position when it was accurately located by German artillery and was forced to withdraw, losing one gun when the horse team was annihilated by a shell. C Battery of the same brigade lost its commander and two guns in ferocious short range fighting. 39th Divisional Artillery alone lost three officers, 70 other ranks, and 110 horses in this action. However, by 15.30 the enemy had withdrawn, and the CRA was able to order 'cease firing' after 10 hours continuous fighting, the guns having fired about 500 rounds each.

The Germans renewed their attack at 17.00 as the guns were being withdrawn to new positions, and got within 400 yards (370 m) of the last battery as it pulled back, but were swept away by a counter-attack by the Australians.

=== 5 April ===
An attempt by the Germans to renew the offensive on 5 April failed and by early morning British Empire troops had forced the enemy out of all but the south-eastern corner of the town. German progress towards Amiens, having reached its furthest point westward, had finally been held. Ludendorff called a halt to the offensive.
