= Attack on the Boar's Head =

1916 battle on the Western Front of World War I

Coordinates: 50°34′19″N 2°44′41″E

- Part of The Western Front, in the First World War
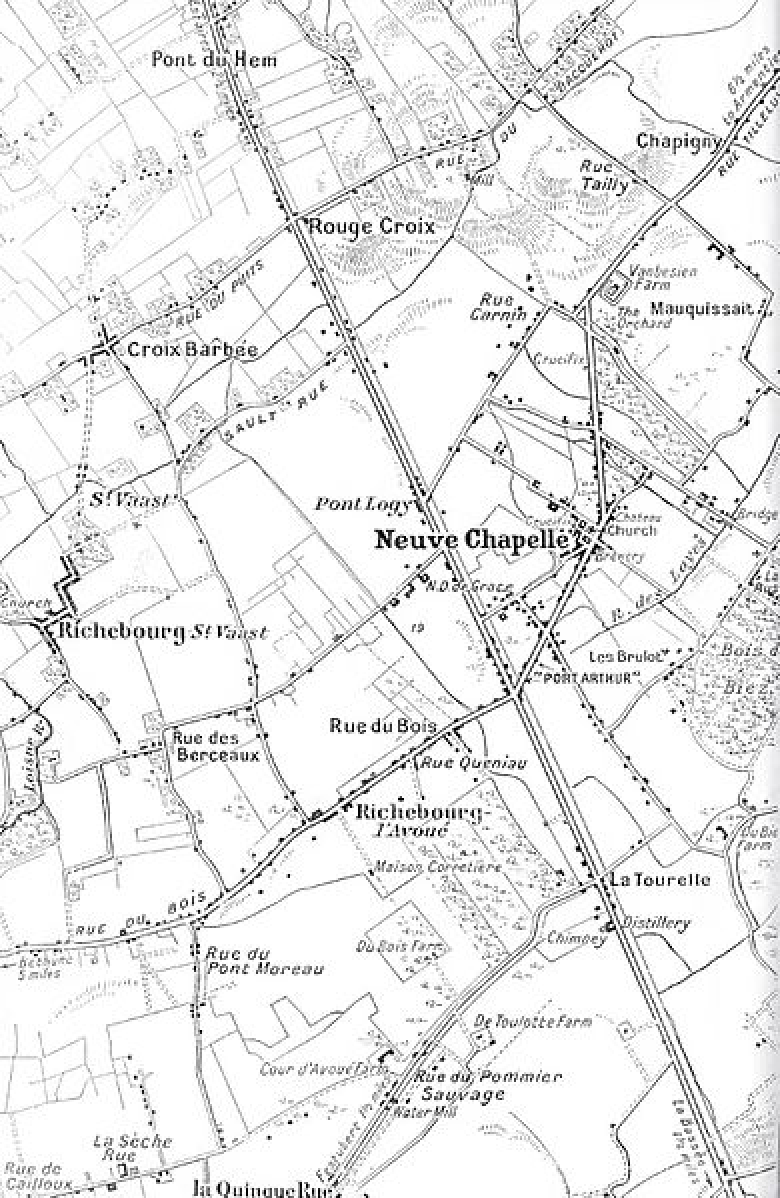
- Richebourg-l'Avoué area, 1914–1916
| Date | 30 June 1916 |
| Location | Artois, France |
| Result | See Aftermath section |

Belligerents
| British Empire | Germany |

Commanders and leaders
| Douglas Haig | Erich von Falkenhayn |

Strength
| 2 battalions | |

Casualties and losses
| 850–1,366 | |
- Richebourg-l'Avoué, commune in the Pas-de-Calais department of northern France

The Attack on the Boar's Head (30 June 1916) was an operation at Richebourg-l'Avoué in France, during the First World War. Troops of the 39th Division, XI Corps in the First Army of the British Expeditionary Force (BEF), advanced to capture the Boar's Head, a salient held by the German 6th Army. Two battalions of the 116th Brigade, with one battalion forming carrying parties, attacked the German front position before dawn on 30 June. The British took and held the German front line trench and the second trench for several hours, before retiring to their lines having suffered 850–1,366 casualties.

The operation was conducted when the British Armies on the Western Front north of the Somme, supported the Fourth Army during the Battle of the Somme (1 July to 18 November). The British Third Army, First Army and Second Army conducted 310 raids against the Germans up to November 1916, harassing the Germans opposite to give novice divisions experience of fighting on the Western Front, to inflict casualties and to prevent German troops from being transferred to the Somme. From 19 to 20 July, XI Corps conducted the much bigger Battle of Fromelles, where British and Australian troops suffered an even greater number of casualties.

== Background ==
On 1 June 1916, General Charles Monro, commander of the First Army, about 30 mi (48 km) north of the Somme, held a conference with the corps commanders for operations to be undertaken when the Fourth Army and the French Sixth Army began the offensive on the Somme. The First Army was to mislead the Germans, exhaust the forces opposite and reduce their efficiency during the preliminary bombardment on the Somme. On 7 June, the XI Corps commander, Lieutenant-General Richard Haking, submitted the corps plan to fulfil the diversion policy, writing that saps had been dug towards the German lines and that assembly trenches from 1915 had been refurbished. The divisions of XI Corps had plans for eight raids, to involve gas, smoke and wire-cutting bombardments each day, from 26 June until 10 July. A model of the German defences was built near each divisional headquarters (HQ) to be used in the planning of raids.

== Prelude ==
=== 39th Division ===
During March 1916, the month that the 39th Division (Major-General Gerald Cuthbert) arrived in France and Haking ordered divisional commanders to make lists of soldiers, NCOs and officers worthy of promotion, since quick advancement on merit encouraged efficiency and boosted morale. Haking was also ready to remove officers and in April wanted the three brigadier-generals of the infantry brigades sacked and replaced with younger men.

=== Raids and counter-raids ===
The German troops opposite XI Corps were not passive and on 26 May, the 39th Division was raided. On 29 May, German raiders got into the 39th Division lines, killed two soldiers and induced several others to cast away their rifles. From 23 June to 14 July, XI Corps conducted 14 raids with mixed results. On 13 June, troops from the 2/4th Royal Berkshire Regiment (2/4th Berkshire) rehearsed a raid on the Ferme du Bois area in the afternoon and after a bombardment, attacked at 11:15 p.m. The raiders found that most of the German wire was uncut and only a small group got into the German front trench. The raiders returned to the British lines having suffered 38 casualties, more than a third of the party. An attack was planned by the 39th Division for the 12th and 13th (Southdowns) battalions of the Royal Sussex Regiment, part of the 116th Southdowns Brigade to occupy the Boar's Head, a salient in the German front line. On the night of 20/21 June, a party of 32 men of A Company, 2/5th Gloucestershire Regiment crossed no man's land to identify units opposite. The British wire was found to be insufficiently cut, the troops were caught by German machine-gun fire in the bottlenecks and were forced back with many casualties.

== Attack ==
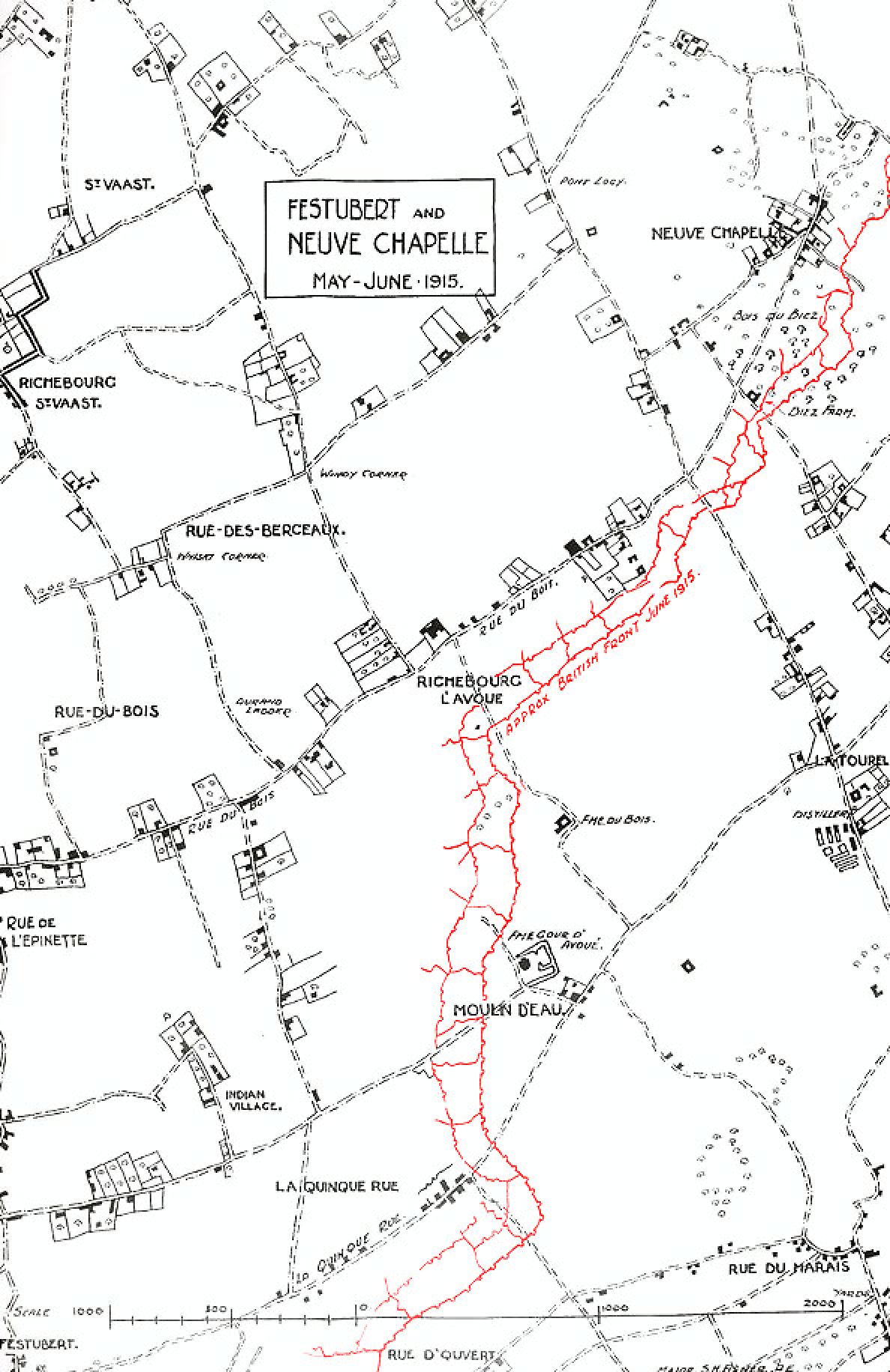
Richebourg-l'Avoué area, 1915–1916

The preliminary destructive bombardment and the wire cutting by the British artillery commenced on the afternoon of 29 June. The bombardments were reported to have been successful and the final bombardment commenced shortly before 3:00 a.m. including smoke shells. The 12th and 13th battalions attacked shortly afterwards at about 3:30 a.m., the 11th Battalion providing carrying parties. The British guns lifted their fire off the German front trench to the support line as the infantry crossed no man's land and German machine-gunners inflicted many casualties. The 13th Battalion survivors got into the German front line trench and then advanced to the second trench, encountering more massed machine-gun fire but captured the trench.

Several German counter-attacks were repulsed and after about half an hour, the raiders withdrew because of a shortage of ammunition and increasing casualties. The 12th Battalion was obstructed by uncut wire but returned to the German front line and held it for a short time before withdrawing. German defensive tactics included shelling their trenches where the British had gained a foothold. On 6 July, the 2nd/1st Battalion, Oxfordshire and Buckinghamshire Light Infantry (OBLI) near Ferme du Bois found that men of the Royal Sussex were still straggling back over no man's land.

== Aftermath ==
=== Analysis ===
After the fiasco of 30 June, Haking wrote that the 39th Division had been in France since March but lacked offensive spirit. The attack on the Boar's Head had led to a great improvement in the fighting value of the division. Haking reported that the attack would have persuaded the Germans to keep reserves in the area, fulfilling the diversion policy. Captain Christie-Miller of the 2nd/1st OBLI called the raid a "disastrous enterprise" which demoralised the British and cheered the Germans opposite.

=== Casualties ===
In 1938, the British official historian, Wilfrid Miles, wrote that the 116th Brigade suffered 950 casualties and in 2012, Michael Senior gave figures of about 850. In less than five hours, the three Southdowns battalions of the Royal Sussex Regiment lost 17 officers and 349 men killed, including 12 sets of brothers, three from one family. Another 1,000 men were wounded or taken prisoner. In the regimental history, the battle is known as "The Day Sussex Died". CSM Nelson Carter was awarded a posthumous Victoria Cross for his actions in the battle.

== Commemoration ==
The Le Touret Commonwealth War Graves Commission cemetery and memorial is sited at Richebourg. It was begun in November 1914 by the Indian Corps (in particular by the 2nd Battalion, Leicestershire Regiment), remaining in use until the end of the war (barring a time in German hands from April–August 1918); the Le Touret Memorial is part of the cemetery. The Rue-des-Berceaux CWGC Cemetery is also here and includes the burial site of New Zealand tennis player Tony Wilding. A modern memorial to the men of the Royal Sussex Regiment is sited within Beach House Park in Worthing, West Sussex.
