= Francis Gleeson (priest) =

British Army military chaplain and priest

- Painting of Gleeson (mounted, centre) on the eve of the Battle of Aubers Ridge in May 1915
- Born: 28 May 1884; Templemore, County Tipperary, Ireland
- Died: 26 June 1959 (aged 75)
- Education: Maynooth College; Clonliffe College
- Military career
- Allegiance: United Kingdom of Great Britain and Ireland
- Branch: British Army; Army Chaplains' Department
- Service years: 1914–1915; 1917–1919
- Rank: Chaplain to the Forces, 4th Class
- Unit: Royal Munster Fusiliers
- Conflicts: First World War: First Battle of Ypres; Battle of Aubers Ridge

Father Francis Gleeson (28 May 1884 – 26 June 1959) was an Irish Roman Catholic priest who served as a British Army chaplain during Ireland's involvement in the First World War. Educated at seminaries near Dublin, Gleeson was ordained in 1910 and worked at a home for the blind before volunteering for service upon the outbreak of war. Commissioned into the Army Chaplains' Department and attached to the 2nd Battalion, Royal Munster Fusiliers he served with them at the First Battle of Ypres. During this battle Gleeson is said to have taken command of the battalion after all the officers were incapacitated by the enemy. He was highly regarded by his men for tending to the wounded under fire, visiting the frontline trenches, and bringing gifts.

On 8 May 1915, on the eve of the Battle of Aubers Ridge, Gleeson addressed the assembled battalion at a roadside shrine and gave the general absolution. The battalion suffered heavily in the battle and when paraded again afterwards only 200 men were assembled. Gleeson's absolution was the subject of a painting by Fortunino Matania that was made at the request of the widow of the battalion's commanding officer. At the end of his year's service in 1915 Gleeson returned to Dublin and became a curate but rejoined the army as a chaplain in 1917 and remained for a further two years. After the war he returned once more to Ireland, becoming a priest at churches near to Dublin and being elected canon of the Metropolitan Chapter of the Archdiocese of Dublin before his death on 26 June 1959.

== Early life ==
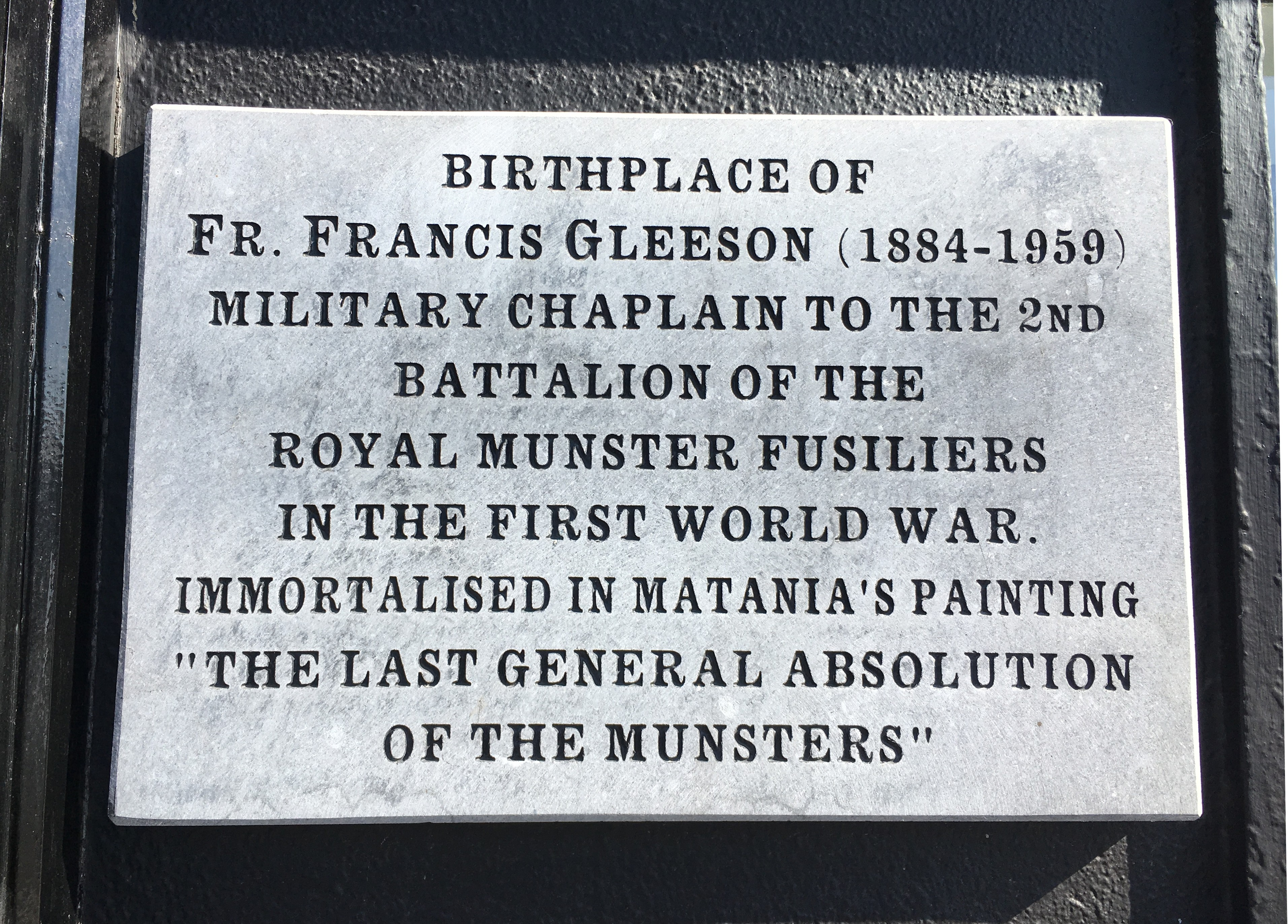
A plaque commemorating Gleeson's birthplace

Gleeson was born on 28 May 1884 in Main Street, Templemore, County Tipperary, Ireland, and was one of thirteen children. Gleeson decided to become a Catholic priest and was educated at the Holy Cross College in Dublin and St Patrick's College in Maynooth. He was ordained as a priest by the Archbishop of Dublin, William Walsh, on 19 June 1910 at St Mary's Pro-Cathedral. Gleeson was appointed chaplain to St. Vincent's Male Orphanage in Glasnevin in October 1910 and lived nearby before being sent as chaplain to St. Mary's Home for the Blind, Dublin in March 1912. Gleeson (not to be confused with Fr Francis Doyle Gleeson, the US Jesuit born 1895) was a speaker of Irish.

== Outbreak of war ==
On the outbreak of the First World War in July 1914 Gleeson volunteered for service with the British Army, one of only 17 Roman Catholic priests to do so. He was commissioned as a Chaplain to the Forces, 4th Class (equivalent to a Captain) in the Army Chaplains' Department on 18 November 1914 and joined the 2nd battalion, Royal Munster Fusiliers who were already in action on the Western Front in France. The battalion, pre-war regular troops who formed part of the 3rd Infantry Brigade of the 1st Division, were amongst the first British troops to be deployed to France. The unit had fought at the Battle of Mons and after Gleeson joined them they participated in the First Battle of Ypres (October–November 1914). British officer and poet Robert Graves recalled in his autobiography Good-Bye to All That that during this battle Gleeson found himself the only unwounded officer of the battalion and, having removed his chaplain's insignia that indicated his non-combatant status, took command of the unit and held until relieved.

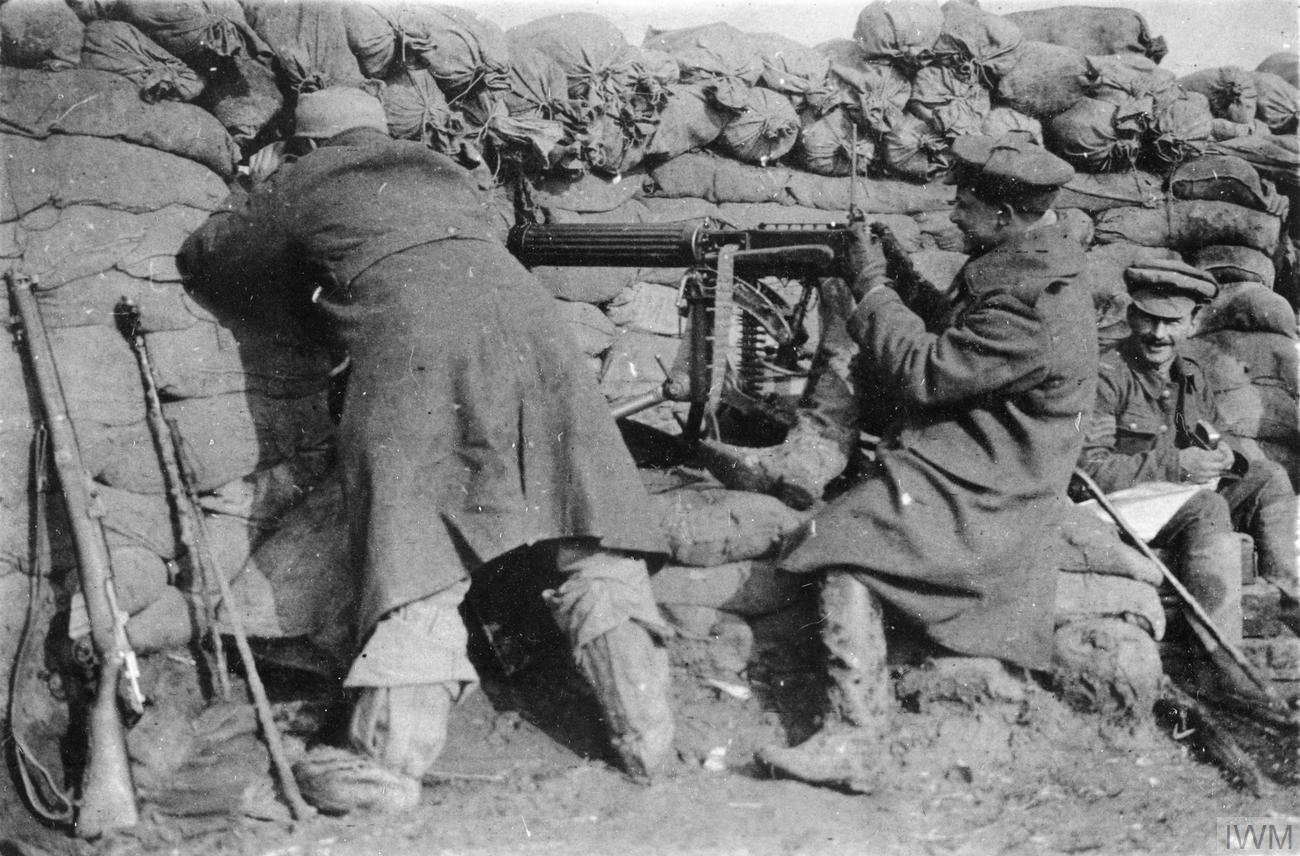
Officers of the 2nd Munster firing a machine gun at Festubert, early 1915

In December he joined the battalion in a counterattack at the Battle of Givenchy. That month he wrote critically of those in Britain who supported the war, stating "If ... advocates of war were made to be soaked and caked and crusted with cold, wet trench mud, like these poor soldiers, and to wear those mud-weighted coats, they would not be so glib with their treatises on the art of war. These militants should be made to undergo a few nights in cheerless billets [and] mud-river trenches to teach them a lesson. What is it all for at all?". On Christmas Day the 2nd Munsters were in part of the front line unaffected by the Christmas Truce and Gleeson chose to conduct a Mass in one of the front line trenches that was frequently under fire. The mass was in memory of the seven officers and 200 men of the Munsters who had died in an action at Festubert from 21 to 22 December. The 2nd Munsters, barely recovered from their earlier losses, were ordered to halt a German advance that had already captured the front line trenches of an Indian unit. The men held out for 60 hours, including what Gleeson called a "dreadful night of carnage", before being relieved. Gleeson noted in his diary that day "such desolation. Such suffering! If all militarists had hearts at all they should bleed, if they saw the scene of frozen men I saw today - this Christmas day of 1914 AD. How I felt on that death region today! Good saviour of the world - will you deem to bring peace and abolish all war forever?"

Gleeson was an advisor to men of all faiths in the regiment and kept careful records of their names and addresses so that he could write to the families of those that died. He recorded the dates that each Catholic man received the sacrament so he could reassure their families that they had died in a state of grace. Gleeson ended each of his letters with the words "They paid a great sacrifice", which was later used as the title of a book published in 2010 that details the wartime service records of men from Cork. Much of his time was spent answering letters from families in Ireland concerned about the wellbeing of their sons and husbands. At times the task almost overwhelmed him and this is evident in his personal diary when he wrote, in June 1915, "I got 12 letters today; just after reading them. What answering they will take tomorrow. I like to give these poor people all the solace I can, anyhow, but still there's no limit to the sorrowing inquiries. The tragedy of these letters".

Gleeson made frequent visits to the front lines and often conducted burial services there with wooden grave-marker crosses that he made himself, or entered no-man's-land to comfort dying soldiers. His men said that they were always sure of a cup of tea from him when he visited the trenches late at night and he was certain to check that they were not short of ammunition. Gleeson sent requests to Ireland for hymnbooks for the men in the field and also bought mouth organs for their entertainment (Gleeson himself was a keen harmonica player). Although he was not a nationalist he supported the right of his soldiers to fly the Irish tricolour in the trenches.

One of Gleeson's men said: "He's a warrior and no mistake. There's no man at the Front more brave or cooler. Why, it is in the hottest place up in the firing line he do be to give comfort to the boys that are dying." His work as a chaplain was renowned, one war correspondent stating: "If you meet a man of the 2nd Munsters, just mention the name of Father Gleeson and see how his face lights up". Quotes from Gleeson were used in Irish recruiting posters and leaflets.

== Aubers Ridge ==
Whilst moving forwards to the trenches on 8 May 1915, in preparation for the Battle of Aubers Ridge, Lieutenant-Colonel Victor Rickard ordered the battalion to halt at a roadside shrine in Rue du Bois, near Fleurbaix. The shrine, which had been pointed out to Rickard by Gleeson, was in fact the altar of the Chapel of Notre Dame de Seez which had been destroyed by shells earlier in the war. Gleeson, who had ridden at the front of the column, addressed the assembled 800 men and gave them the general absolution whilst still mounted on his horse. The men then sang the hymns Hail, Queen of Heaven, the Te Deum and Hail Glorious Saint Patrick before Gleeson moved along the ranks bidding farewell to the officers and encouraging the men to maintain the honour of the regiment. Gleeson followed the battalion to the start of the trenches to bid the men farewell.

The battalion launched their attack at 5.30 the next morning. The Munsters were largely cut down by machine gun fire before they had advanced more than a few yards although enough men survived to capture the German trenches, the only unit to do so that day, before being forced to withdraw. Casualties in the battalion amounted to 11 officers and 140 men killed, including Lieutenant-Colonel Rickard, in addition to 8 officers and 230 men wounded. Gleeson made it his duty to attend to the wounded and dying, comforting them and delivering the last rites, despite German shells landing close by him. Gleeson wrote in his diary that night that "it was ghastly to see them lying there in the cold, cheerless outhouses on beare stretchers with no blankets to cover their freezing limbs". This quote was selected for a stone at the Island of Ireland Peace Park, Messines, Belgium erected in 1998 to commemorate the Irish dead of the war.

After the battle the Munsters once again assembled at the Rue de Bois, though only three officers and 200 men were found fit to parade. Gleeson was upset by the high death toll and the heartfelt letters he received from family members of killed and wounded soldiers. Rickard's widow, Jessie Louisa Rickard, requested that war artist Fortunino Matania immortalise the parade at Rue de Bois in a painting that centred on Gleeson delivering the absolution (Rickard is also depicted in the background). The painting was printed in The Sphere on 27 November 1916 and was widely reproduced elsewhere throughout the war. The painting was destroyed by German bombs during the Second World War. Gleeson later donated the stole he wore for the parade to the regimental museum.

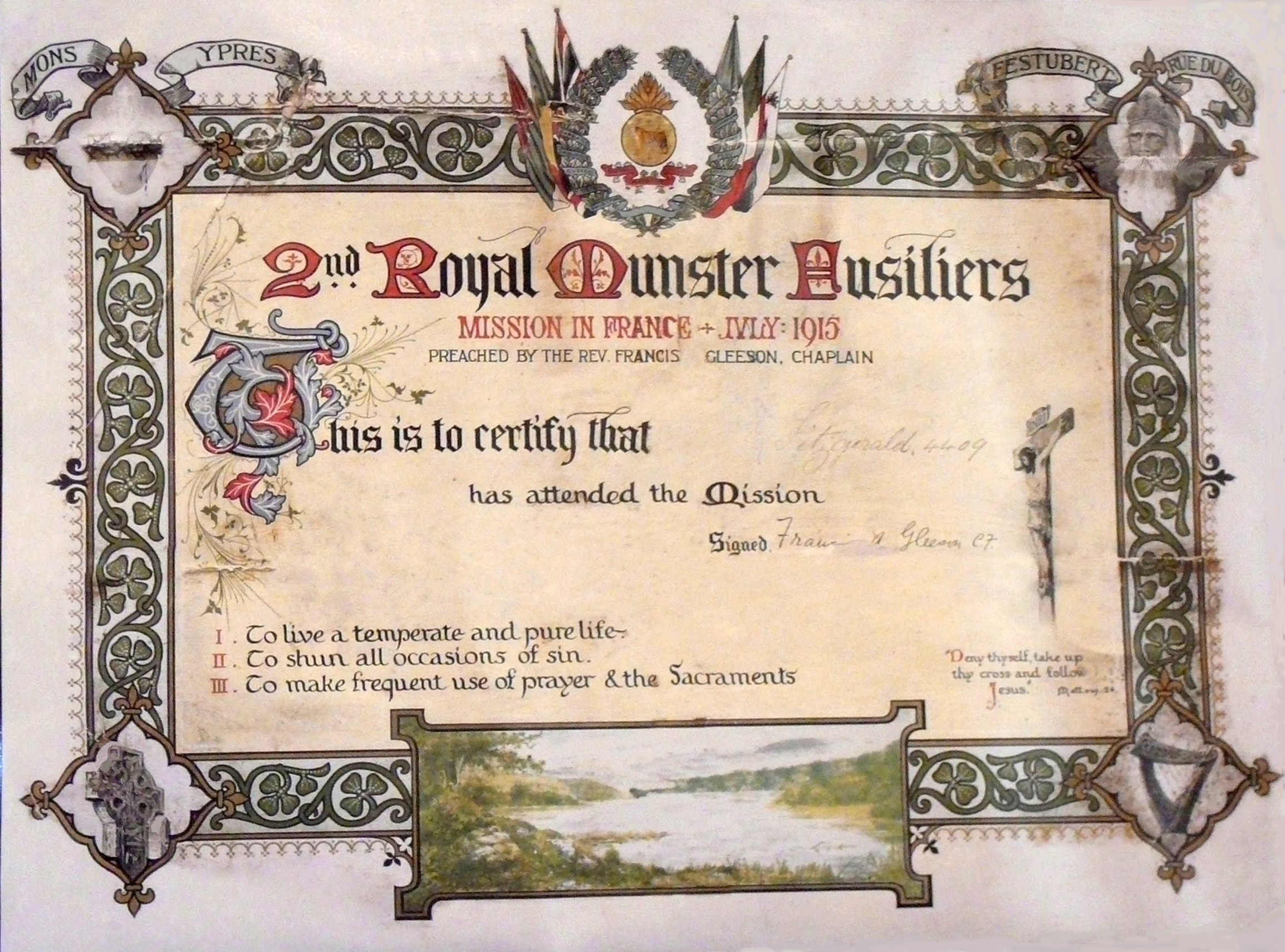
Document certifying attendance at Father Gleeson's Mission in France, July 1915

In July 1915 Gleeson held a preaching mission in the British lines. He issued a certificate, designed by himself, to all who attended. The certificate included the names of major battles that the Munsters had fought in, the flags of Allied nations, a crucifix, the Celtic cross and the Irish harp. The text recommended that soldiers lead a temperate life, avoid sinning and to frequently pray.

Gleeson further distinguished himself later that year by assisting in the defence of a trench against enemy attack and served with the Munsters in action on 25 September 1915 in the Battle of Loos. He had a strong commitment to the idea of freeing Belgium from German occupation but was known to be critical of what he considered anti-clerical views held by the French authorities.

Having originally agreed to serve for a year Gleeson wrote to Father Bernard Rawlinson, the senior Roman Catholic chaplain, in October 1915 requesting that he be relieved of duty at the end of his current contract. He stated that "I am sorry to be leaving the dear old Munster lads, but I really can't stand it any longer. I do not like the life, though I love the poor men ever so much". Gleeson returned to Ireland and after a period of convalescence served as curate at the newly opened Church of Our Lady of Lourdes in Dublin from 16 December.

== Late war and Irish Free State service ==
Gleeson later had a change of heart and requested permission from Archbishop Walsh to return to army service. He was recommissioned in his previous rank on 15 May 1917 on a two-year contract. Gleeson returned to the 2nd Battalion, Royal Munster Fusiliers and served with them in action at the Capture of Wytschaete, the First Battle of Passchendaele, the Battle of Langemarck, the Second Battle of Passchendaele and the Battle of Cambrai. When the 2nd Battalion were transferred to the 48th Brigade, 16th (Irish) Division on 29 January 1918 Gleeson remained with the 1st Infantry Division. He remained with the division, returning with them to England on 2 July 1918, until his period of duty ended in May 1919.

Gleeson then returned once more to Ireland and his position at the Church of Our Lady of Lourdes. He encountered hostility from Irish republicans due to his association with the British Army; it is said that the Bishop of Cork, Daniel Cohalan, a fervent nationalist, deliberately placed Gleeson in pro-republican parishes. Gleeson was appointed curate in St Michael's Parish, Dún Laoghaire on 13 July 1920. On 4 June 1922 he attended the dedication of Étreux British Cemetery which holds the remains of 110 men of the Royal Munster Fusiliers who were killed in the defence of Étreux against superior German forces whilst acting in a rearguard action for the Great Retreat of August 1914. Thanks to his previous military experience Gleeson received an appointment as command chaplain to Dublin Army Command of the Irish Free State Army in February 1923, and was with them through the Irish Civil War.

== Dramatist ==
Gleeson successfully wrote and produced two dramas. The first, depicting the first Holy Week, was entitled Bethany to Calvary, was staged at the Theatre Royal, Dublin in February 1931 and received high praise from many authorities on sacred drama. It was subsequently staged in the Abbey Theatre Dublin in April 1935. In March 1938 it was presented again during the Sundays of Lent and the Passion Week with a cast of seventy at Our Lady's Hall in Inchicore, Dublin.

His second drama Rose of Battle was set in the French lines during the 1914–18 war, in which one of two soldier friends is reconciled to his faith and Church after his friend is killed but he, though badly wounded, becomes miraculously cured through the prayers of his friend's sister, a hospital nurse. The drama was widely acclaimed in 1935 when staged at the Abbey Theatre, Dublin (casting Cyril Cusack), the Opera House, Cork, and the Theatre Royal, Waterford.

== Later life and legacy ==
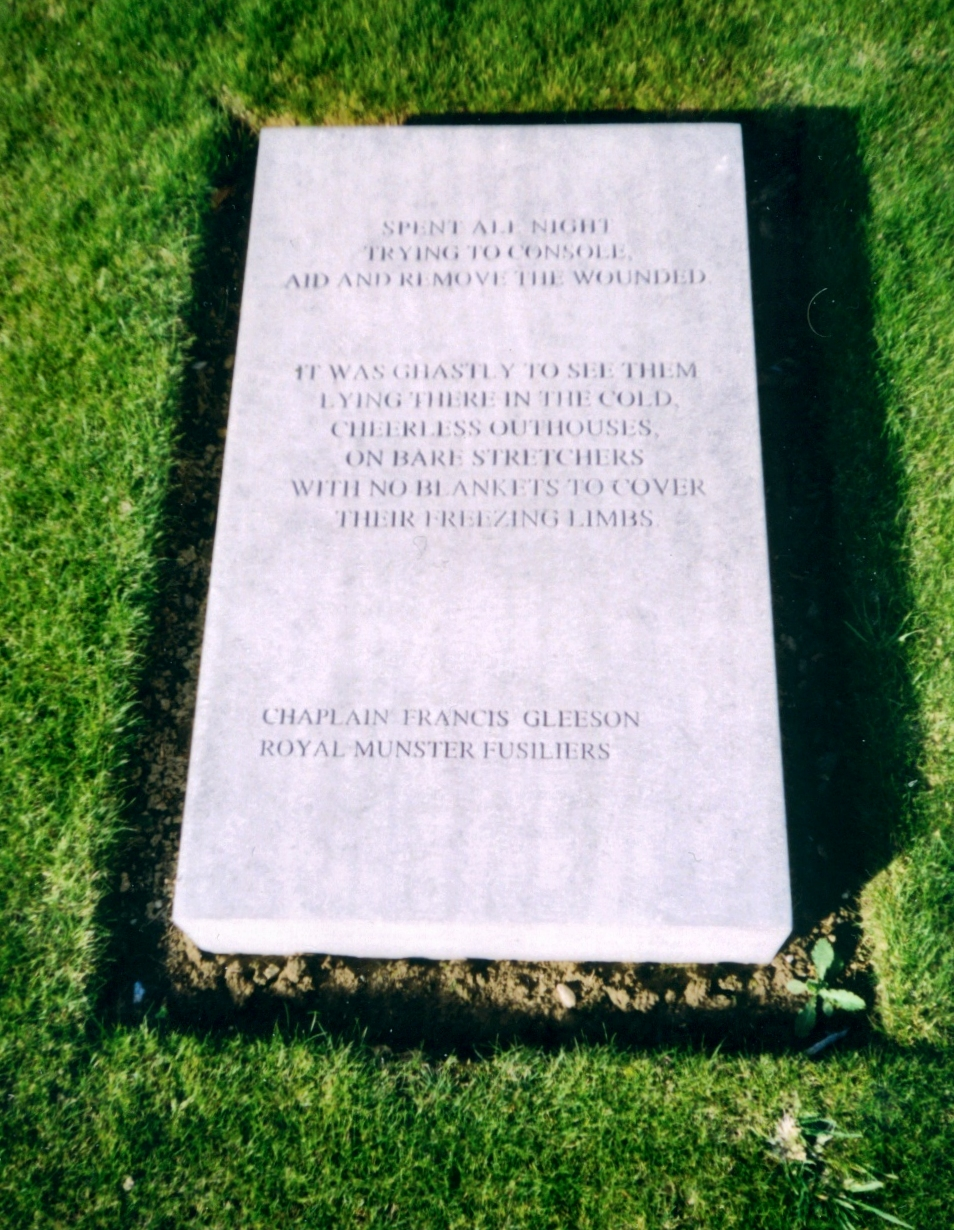
The tablet inscribed with a quote by Father Gleeson at the Island of Ireland Peace Park, Messines, Belgium

Gleeson was appointed curate of Bray, Aughrim, on 18 May 1924 and became the priest of the parish on 20 January 1941. He was appointed parish priest of St Catherine's in Meath Street, Dublin on 30 August 1944. Gleeson was elected a canon of the Metropolitan Chapter of the Archdiocese of Dublin on 7 May 1956 and died on 26 June 1959. He was buried at the Glasnevin Cemetery in Dublin. His grave faces west as is traditional for Christian clergy, and points towards the altar of the cemetery's mortuary chapel. The Old Comrades Association of the Royal Munster Fusiliers honoured him in their annual report, stating that he was "a canon when he died. A saint when next we all meet".

Gleeson's war diaries were discovered in a room at his clergy house many years after his death and are held by the Archdiocese of Dublin and the National Museum of Ireland at Collins Barracks, Dublin. The diaries, notes and records from the diocesan collection were digitised in an 18-month-long joint project with the University College Dublin that was completed in April 2015. Gleeson is mentioned in Frank Delaney's novel Shannon, set in post-war Ireland, with reference made to his taking command of the battalion at the First Battle of Ypres and to being "a bit shook up" by his experiences.

The stole Gleeson wore during his famous absolution before Aubers Ridge was rediscovered in August 2014 in the collection of the National Army Museum, having been acquired by them in 1959. A memorial was unveiled on the centenary of the fighting at Aubers Ridge in May 2015 at the recently rediscovered site of Gleeson's absolution at Rue de Bois.

== Sources ==
- Broom, John (2015). Fight the Good Fight. Barnsley, South Yorkshire: Pen and Sword. ISBN 978-1-47385-415-4.
- McGreevy, Ronan (2016). Wherever the Firing Line Extends: Ireland and the Western Front. Dublin, Ireland: History Press Ireland. ISBN 978-1-84588-873-2.
- MacThomais, Shane (2012). Dead Interesting Stories from the Graveyards of Dublin. Cork, Ireland: Mercier Press Ltd. ISBN 978-1-78117-052-6.
