= Noel Newman Lombard Craig =

Distinguished Irish soldier

- Born: Newman Lombard Craig; 11 November 1884; Ireland
- Died: 31 October 1968 (aged 83); Wicklow, Ireland
- Burial place: Titusville, Pennsylvania
- Military career
- Allegiance: United Kingdom
- Branch: Queen's Own Cameron Highlanders, Royal Munster Fusiliers
- Service years: 1906–1924
- Rank: Colonel
- Nickname: Bungo
- Conflicts: World War I: Battle of Messines (1917)
- Awards: Distinguished Service Order, Legion of Honour & Sword of Honour
- Other work: Military Attaché, British Diplomatic Service

Noel Newman Lombard Craig DSO OBE (1884–1968) was an Irish soldier who served in the First World War. He was decorated on several occasions including Distinguished Service Order, Legion of Honour, Order of the British Empire and the Sword of Honour.

== Early life ==
Craig was born in 1884, in Naas, County Kildare, Ireland. He was named after Cardinal Newman, who was a friend of his mother. In later years, Craig added Noel to his name by Deed Poll. He was given the nickname "Bungo" by his older brother George, because he thought his little brother's bright and intelligent eyes resembled the famous elephant in Dublin Zoo, Bungo, who used to gaze at visitors at length as though he wanted to have a friendly conversation. He attended Trinity College, Dublin to study politics, graduating with a B.A. in 1905. He enlisted into the Cameron Highlanders in 1906, later transferring to The Royal Munster Fusiliers. During his training Craig was awarded the Sword of Honour for excellence in military training.

== Military and decorations ==
Whilst a member of the Royal Munster Fusiliers, Craig served in India until 1913. He fought at Mons (1914) and the Battle of Messines (1917). In June 1917, at Wytschaete, he was the only one of a group of officers to survive German shelling.

During World War II, Craig was a military attaché and was posted to Norway, Finland, Spain, and Denmark, with his activities earning him a place on the Nazi blacklist. Craig was awarded a number of honours including the Distinguished Service Order (DSO) and becoming a member of the French Legion of Honour.

== Later life ==
Craig married Marian Eleanor Quinby in 1926, having three daughters, Pamela, Clemency and Rosemary. Craig retired from the British diplomatic service in 1954, returning to London to practice law at King's Inn. He was also a published author, writing several novels and over fifty short stories, including Gulfs (1932). Quinby was a native of Titusville, Pennsylvania, with Craig appearing to retire there later in life.
