= Robert Baynes =

Robert Baynes may refer to:

- Robert Hall Baynes (1831–1895), bishop and hymn writer
- Robert Lambert Baynes (1796–1869), British Royal Navy admiral
- Robert Stuart Baynes (died 1902), British Army officer
- Robert Baynes, British Royal Navy officer involved in the Wager Mutiny in 1741
