= William Cosgrove =

William Cosgrove VC MSM
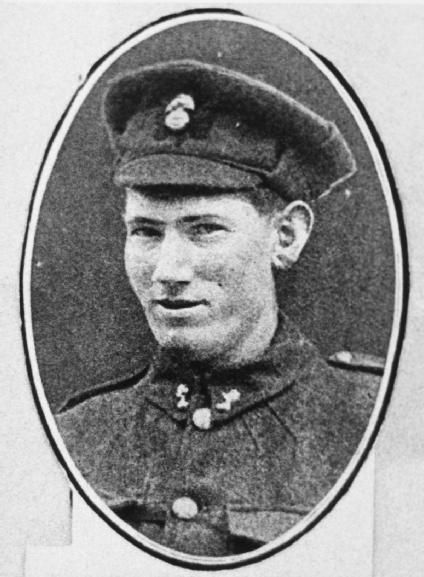
- Born: 1 October 1888; Aghada, County Cork
- Died: 14 July 1936 (aged 47); Millbank, London
- Burial place: Upper Aghada
- Military career
- Allegiance: United Kingdom of Great Britain and Ireland
- Branch: British Army
- Service years: 1909–1935
- Rank: Staff Sergeant
- Units: Royal Munster Fusiliers; Northumberland Fusiliers; Indian Territorial Force
- Conflicts: First World War
- Awards: Victoria Cross; Meritorious Service Medal

William Cosgrove VC MSM (1 October 1888 – 14 July 1936) was an Irish recipient of the Victoria Cross, the highest and most prestigious award for gallantry in the face of the enemy that can be awarded to British and Commonwealth forces.

== Background ==
William Cosgrove was born at Aghada, County Cork on 1 October 1888, the son of Michael and Mary Cosgrove. He had four brothers, Dan, Ned, David, Joseph and a sister Mary-Catherine. While they were still young their father emigrated to Australia, but later returned. In the meantime his wife moved with her children to a cottage in nearby Peafield, and the children attended school at the National School, Ballinrostig. William began work at as an apprentice butcher at Whitegate, and one of his daily chores was a morning delivery to Fort Carlisle (now Fort Davis) with a consignment of meat for the troops. It was from Fort Carlisle that he joined the army.

== First World War ==
William Cosgrove enlisted in the Royal Munster Fusiliers on 24 March 1909 and was given the regimental number 8980. At the outbreak of war the 1st Battalion of the Munster Fusiliers was stationed in Rangoon, Burma, as regular battalions were routinely stationed overseas. They left Rangoon on 21 November 1914, and William Cosgrove (now Corporal) landed in England on 10 January 1915. Upon landing they still wore their Indian issue uniforms and stood on the cold quay in their khaki drill shorts. The battalion was then assigned to the 86th Brigade of the 29th Division (United Kingdom), in preparation for the landings at the Dardanelles.

=== Gallipoli ===
The 1st Munsters, together with the 1st Battalion Royal Dublin Fusiliers and Hampshire Regiment, were on the converted collier 'River Clyde' when it ran ashore for the Cape Helles 'V' beach landing on 25 April 1915 at 06.20 am. On departing from the ship's bay they were subject to fierce enfilading machine gun fire from hidden Turkish defences. One hundred or more of the Battalion's men fell at this stage of the battle, and those who managed to get ashore could not advance due to the withering Turkish fire. On the following day it was decided to destroy the wire entanglements facing the men, as the naval bombardment had failed to do so. It was during this attack that Corporal Cosgrove 1st RMF, performed the action that was to earn him the regiment's first Victoria Cross of the war. The action was described by Cosgrove himself:

"Our job was to dash ahead, face the trenches, bristling with rifle and machine guns and destroy the wire entanglements. Fifty men were entailed for the work, poor Sergeant-Major Bennett led us, but was killed, a bullet through the brain. I then took charge, shouted to the boys to come on, from the village near at hand came terrible fire to swell the murderous hall of bullets from the trenches. Some of us got close to the wire and we started to cut it with a pliers, you might as well try and snip Cloyne Round Tower with a scissors." He then grabbed hold of the stakes holding the barbed wire, "I dashed at the first one, heaved and strained and it came into my arms … I believe there was wild cheering when they saw what I was at, but I only heard the screech of bullets and saw dirt rising all round from where they hit. I could not tell you how many I pulled up. I did my best and the boys around me were every bit as good as myself."

He was also wounded during this action. Promoted to Sergeant, he saw no further action due to his wound, which was a contributing factor in his death later on.

=== Victoria Cross ===
The award of the V.C. was gazette on 23 August 1915. It stated that it was awarded:

"For most conspicuous bravery leading this section with great dash during our attack from the beach to the east of Cape Helles on the Turkish positions on 26 April 1915. Cpl Cosgrove on this occasion pulled down the posts of the enemy’s high wire entanglements single-handed, notwithstanding a terrible fire from both front and flank, thereby greatly contributing to the successful clearing of the heights."

— London Gazette August 1915

On 26 April 1915, the second day of the disastrous V beach landing at Cape Helles, during the Battle of Gallipoli, Turkey, when just three companies of Munsters had made it to the shelter of some dunes, at daybreak they charged to take the village behind the Sedd el Bahr fort overlooking the bay. Corporal Cosgrove led a company section during the attack on the Turkish positions. Barbed wire held them up and Corporal Cosgrove, described by his command as "an Irish Giant" set himself the task of pulling the stanchion posts of the enemy's high wire entanglement single-handed out of the ground, notwithstanding the terrific fire from both front and flanks with officers and men falling all around him. Thanks to his exceptional bravery, his heroic actions contributed greatly to the successful clearing of the heights. Turkish counter-attacks were held off.

He was described by Surgeon P.Burrowes-Kelly, RN., D.S.O., as an "Irish giant" and by a person from Aghada who remembered him "As a very shy man who hated to be fussed over."

== Later career ==
Cosgrove transferred to the Royal Fusiliers in 1918, to the Leinster Regiment in 1920, the Northumberland Fusiliers in 1922, and later went as an Instructor to the Indian Territorial Force in 1928 to become 7042223 Staff Sgt Instructor. He came home in 1935 pending discharge to pension. However, he was admitted to Millbank hospital, and took discharge before he was fit. After a short leave in Cork, he returned to London, where he was admitted to Middlesex hospital. He was later transferred to Millbank hospital London, where he died on 21 July 1936 aged 47.

== Final salute ==
The Royal Munster Fusilier's Old Comrades Association Journal recorded his funeral:

His body was conveyed from London to Fishguard by road en route to Upper Aghada, County Cork in Ireland for interment there, in his native place. About five hundred members of the O.C.A. of the R.M.F. Association met the vessel at Penrose Quay and formed a guard of honour as the coffin was taken from the boat to the waiting hearse. The grand salute was also sounded, the guard of honour standing to attention bare-headed. The courtege subsequently left Penrose Quay and proceeded by road to Aghada. Capt. D. D. Sheehan R.M.F. was in charge of the Comrades. When the remains reached Upper Aghada, the coffin was removed from the hearse and members of the O. C. Association from Cork and his native place shouldered the coffin to the family burial ground at Upper Aghada. A striking and impressive spectacle was the sounding of the Last Post, while the other ex-army men stood to attention. It was stated that it is an unusual spectacle in these days, and many people were visibly moved. When the interment had taken place a beautiful wreath was laid on the grave on behalf of the Association, and this simple ceremony closed the chapter in the life of a great Irish soldier, "An Irish giant … a shy man who hated to be fussed over.

— RMF Old Comrades Association Journal, 1936

On 16 June 1940, the O.C.A., of the Royal Munster Fusiliers unveiled a memorial over the grave.

== Medals ==
In 1972, Cosgrove's V.C., was sold for a record price £2,300 to a private collector. When questioned about the high price which the medal fetched, the auctioneer replied "When one buys a gallantry medal, it is not just the medal one buys, but the act that won it. William Cosgrove’s Victoria Cross together with his other medals was sold at an auction by Dix Noonan Webb held on 22 September 2006 for The world's most valuable auction of orders, decorations and medals. A total of £1,965,010 was spent by 305 different buyers, a figure which represents "the highest amount ever realised by any numismatic auction in the UK". The day's highest price, £180,000, was paid by a collector for the Gallipoli landings Victoria Cross group of six, which included the medal awarded to Sgt. William Cosgrove, Royal Munster Fusiliers.
