= James Upton =

Recipient of the Victoria Cross (1888–1949)

James Upton VC
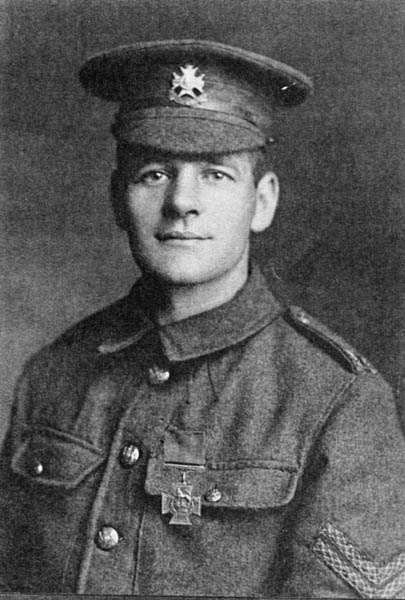
- Born: 3 May 1888; Lincoln, Lincolnshire, England
- Died: 10 August 1949 (aged 61); Edgware, Middlesex, England
- Military career
- Allegiance: United Kingdom
- Branch: British Army
- Rank: Corporal
- Service number: 10082
- Units: Sherwood Foresters
- Conflicts: World War I
- Awards: Victoria Cross

Corporal James Upton VC (3 May 1888 − 10 August 1949) was a British Army soldier and an English recipient of the Victoria Cross (VC), the highest and most prestigious award for gallantry in the face of the enemy that can be awarded to British and Commonwealth forces.

He was 27 years old, and a corporal in the 1st Battalion, The Sherwood Foresters (The Nottinghamshire and Derbyshire Regiment), British Army during the First World War at the battle of Aubers Ridge when the following deed took place for which he was awarded the VC.

On 9 May 1915 at Rouges Bancs, France, Corporal Upton rescued the wounded while exposed to rifle and artillery fire, going close to the enemy's parapet. One wounded man was killed by a shell while the corporal was carrying him. When not actually carrying the wounded, he was engaged in dressing and bandaging the serious cases in front of our parapet.

His Victoria Cross is displayed at the Sherwood Foresters Museum, The Castle, Nottingham, England.

== Bibliography ==
- Monuments to Courage (David Harvey, 1999)
- Batchelor, Peter; Matson, Christopher (2011). The Western Front 1915. VCs of the First World War. Stroud, Gloucestershire: The History Press. ISBN 978-0-7524-6057-4.
- Buzzell, Nora, ed. (1997). The Register of the Victoria Cross. Cheltenham, Gloucestershire: This England Alma House. ISBN 0-906324-27-0.
