= Étreux =

- Commune
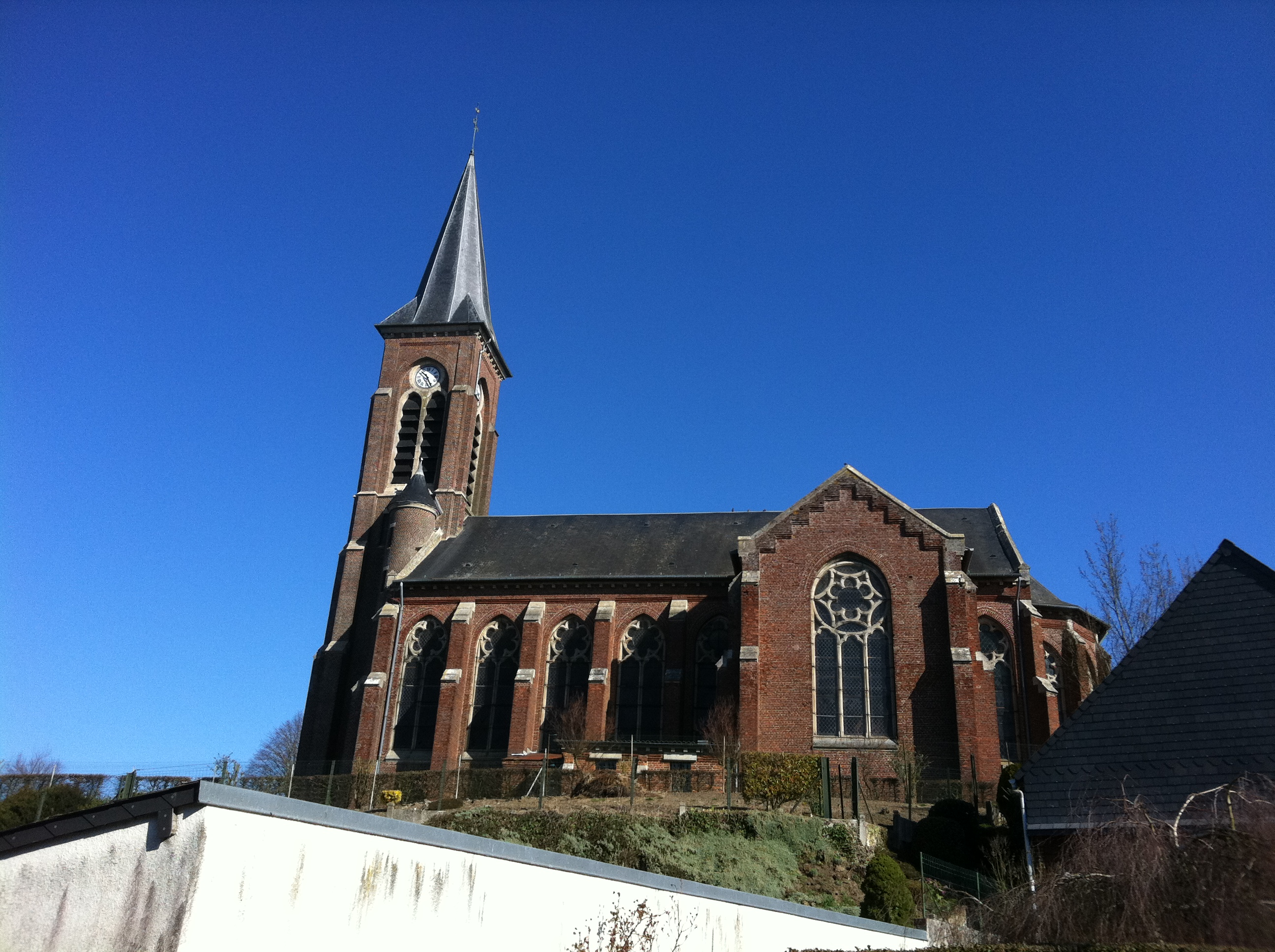
- The church of Étreux

- Coat of arms
- Location of Étreux
- Location within France Location within Hauts-de-France
- Coordinates: 49°59′42″N 3°39′27″E
- Country: France
- Region: Hauts-de-France
- Department: Aisne
- Arrondissement: Vervins
- Canton: Guise

Government
  - Mayor (2026–32): Bertrand Duferme
- Area^{1}: 10.36 km^{2} (4.00 sq mi)
- Elevation: 144 m (472 ft)
- Highest elevation: 160 m (520 ft)
- Lowest elevation: 115 m (377 ft)
- Population (2023): 1,436
  - Density: 138.6/km^{2} (359.0/sq mi)
- Time zone: UTC+01:00 (CET)
  - Summer (DST): UTC+02:00 (CEST)
- INSEE/Postal code: 02298 /02510
- ^{1} French Land Register data, which excludes lakes, ponds, glaciers > 1 km^{2} (0.386 sq mi or 247 acres) and river estuaries.

Étreux (French pronunciation: [etʁø]) is a commune in the Aisne department in Hauts-de-France in northern France.

== History ==
The first major engagement of the British Expeditionary Force (BEF) in the First World War in August 1914, resulted in what became known as the Great Retreat during the Battle of Mons, in the course of which a strategic rearguard action was called for in order to allow the BEF to escape.

Tasked with holding their ground under all circumstances, the 2nd Royal Munster Fusiliers, in their first action in France, achieved a military feat seldom paralleled in modern warfare. A brigade may occasionally have the task of trying to delay a whole enemy division. A division may perhaps be deployed in an attempt to turn aside or halt an advancing army corps – but for a single battalion to stem the advance of an entire army by their sole action was unprecedented. In fact, less than a battalion strength, just 3 companies of the 2nd. Battalion of The Munsters halted the advance of the German Army for fourteen hours in the area of Oisny & Étreux during the retreat from Mons on 27 August, thus enabling the rest of the British Army to withdraw to a safe distance of twelve miles.

In their action at Ètreux the 2nd Munsters were decimated, with only five officers and 196 other ranks surviving. Nevertheless, the Battalion's action effectively prevented German pursuit of the BEF I Corps. They were outnumbered at odds of over 6 to 1, and when finally defeated, the survivors were congratulated on their supreme bravery by the German soldiers they had fought.

In 1922, a cross was erected in an orchard in Étreux, just behind the railway station, to the memory of 120 men of the Munsters's 2nd. Battalion who fell there in their last stand on 27 August 1914. The officers and men of the Regiment who died in that battle are buried there alongside the carved monumental cross dedicated to their memory. Part of the inscription reads " In proud and lasting memory of ..... the officers, warrant officers, non-commissioned officers and men of the 2nd. Battalion, Royal Munster Fusiliers ..... who laid down their lives during The Great War in the cause of Freedom and Justice, 1914–1918"

The Great War occupation by the Germans soldiers in Etreux has been recorded by Albert Denisse (1868 – 1946)

== Population ==
Historical population
Year	Pop.	±% p.a.
1968	1,588	—
1975	1,655	+0.59%
1982	1,839	+1.52%
1990	1,754	−0.59%
1999	1,670	−0.54%
2007	1,604	−0.50%
2012	1,481	−1.58%
2017	1,459	−0.30%
2023	1,436	−0.26%
Source: INSEE

== See also ==
- Communes of the Aisne department
