= Royal Munster Fusiliers (Reserves) =

The Royal Munster Fusiliers held the 'home' Depot for their three Reserve Battalions at Ballymullen Barracks, Tralee, County Kerry, Ireland, where since 1881 most of the regiment's recruits enlisted in peacetime and received their first training before being assigned to regular battalions stationed around the UK and Ireland. Regular officers and N.C.O.s also provided instruction for part-time special reserve battalions during their annual training camps and other special courses during the year.

== 3rd (Reserve), 4th, 5th (Extra Reserve) Battalions ==
=== Mobilisation ===
At the outbreak of war the Royal Munster Fusiliers three reserve battalions were all mobilised on 4 August 1914 and the regimental colours were sent to Tralee for safekeeping there until after the Armistice. The 4RMF (formerly the Kerry Militia (1793–1908)) had a stirring send-off on their way to Berehaven . The 3RMF (formerly the South Cork Militia (1793–1908)) were assembled at Kinsale before proceeding to Queenstown, the 5RMF (formerly the Royal Limerick County Militia (1793–1908)) were mobilised at the Strand Barracks, Limerick travelling on to join the 4RMF. Their initial assignment was to be coastal defence, but due to losses reducing the 2nd (Regular) Battalion to less than 200 within a month of the war, most of the pre-war reservists, particularly those of the 3RMF, were used to rebuild it. The 3RMF was deployed to Aghada, Cork Harbour in May 1915 and from 1917 was barracked at Ballincollig.

=== Assignments ===
The 4th and 5th (Extra Reserve) Battalions joined other battalions in coastal defences of England due to an invasions scare, 4th to Redcar Yorkshire, the 5th to North Shields County Durham. Both battalions who were popular during their stay, returned to Ireland by the end of 1915, 5th assigned to the Curragh, 4th to Fermoy, then to Bere Island in February 1916. All three reserves were now at the location they would occupy for most of the war, the 3RMF with 76 officers and 1927 men being by far the strongest battalion (the other two comparatively weak with 500 men). Unless used as replacements for battalions in action, none of the RMF Reservists died during the war other than by accidents, sicknesses or natural causes. Nor were any killed during the 1916 Rebellion, although some RMFs were dispatched to Dublin from the Curragh, others to Wexford and to Galway.

=== Disbandment ===
In April 1917 the 4RMF joined the 5RMF at the Curragh. In August the 4th moved to Castlebar County Mayo, the 5th to Galway. With the changed political situation and growth in support for Sinn Féin loyalty was under test. Reports of loss of rifles, Lewis guns and ammunition necessitated the massive transfer of the battalions out of the country in November, the 3rd to Devonport, England, the others to Scotland, 4th to Invergordon the 5th to Dreghorn. With the possibility of the extension of conscription to Ireland those Irish battalions still stationed in Ireland were transferred to England in April 1918. The RMFs were relocated again, 3rd to Plymouth, 4th to Portobello and the 5th to Fort George, all three eventually amalgamating at Plymouth by August. The 3rd was absorbed into the 1st RMF in June 1919 . The Tralee Depot and the remaining reserves were moved to Devonport in England where they were disbanded on 31. July 1922.

== 1st, 2nd (Garrison) Battalions ==
Garrison battalions were first formed by the RMF in April 1917, and were one of four Irish regiments to form them during the war, although the RMF had contributed men to other earlier formed garrison battalions. The battalions were mainly made up of soldiers no longer fit for front service. The 1st.(Garrison) was formed and stationed at Victoria barracks, Cork of men transferred from earlier garrisons to which were added men of the Leinster Regiment, the Connaught Rangers as well as men of the RMF.

The garrison provided men for guard duty around the southern coast from the Shannon estuary round to Arklow, County Wicklow. Here there was the Kynock Ammunition Factory to be guarded employing 4,000 people, where a mysterious explosion occurred on 21/22 September 1917 killing 27 people. In November the garrison was transferred to England with all other Irish battalions. It was first stationed at Press Heath, Shropshire, then in January 1918 moved to Italy, based at Arquata Scrivia, providing guards for the British GHQ, airfield, ammunition stores and general lines of communication. It returned to Portsmouth, England in April 1920 and was disbanded the following month.

The 2nd garrison was made up of those who remained after the 1st. Garrison departed for Italy and was formed in April 1918 at Portsmouth. The unit received and provided drafts for many Irish regiments abroad resulting in a high fluctuation of personnel. It was disbanded in February 1919.

== RMF (Regular) Battalions ==
History of 1st and 2nd (Regular) Battalions related under

- Royal Munster Fusiliers

== New Army (Service) Battalions ==
History of 6th, 7th, 8th, 9th, and 10th (Service) Battalions related under

- Royal Munster Fusiliers (New Army)
