= Arthur Batten-Pooll =

Recipient of the Victoria Cross

Arthur Hugh Henry Batten-Pooll
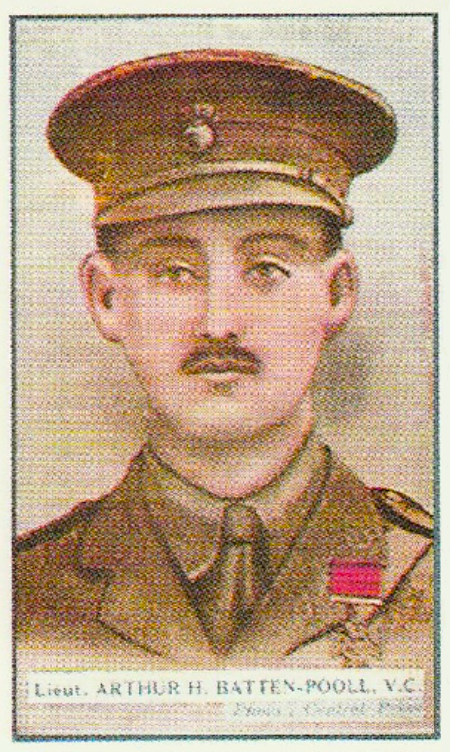
- Batten-Pooll depicted on a cigarette card
- Born: 25 October 1891; Knightsbridge, London
- Died: 21 January 1971 (aged 79); Ivybridge, Devon
- Burial place: St Lawrence's Churchyard, Woolverton
- Military career
- Allegiance: United Kingdom
- Branch: British Army
- Service years: 1911–1919
- Rank: Captain
- Units: Somerset Light Infantry; 5th (Royal Irish) Lancers; Royal Munster Fusiliers
- Conflicts: World War I: Western Front (WIA); Russian Civil War: Allied intervention
- Awards: Victoria Cross; Military Cross; Mentioned in dispatches

Arthur Hugh Henry Batten-Pooll VC MC (25 October 1891 – 21 January 1971) was an English recipient of the Victoria Cross, the highest and most prestigious award for gallantry in the face of the enemy that can be awarded to British and Commonwealth forces.

Born in Knightsbridge, London, he was brought up in Bath and educated at Eton College. In June 1911 he was commissioned into the 3rd Battalion Somerset Light Infantry, a part of the Special Reserve of the British Army, resigning in July 1914.

== First World War ==
In September 1914, after the outbreak of the First World War, he was again commissioned into Special Reserve, first with the 5th Royal Irish Lancers and then the 3rd Battalion Royal Munster Fusiliers, serving in Ireland. In February 1916 he was posted to France with the 2nd Battalion Royal Munster Fusiliers.

He was a 24 years old Lieutenant in the Royal Munster Fusiliers, British 1st Division during the First World War when the following deed took place for which he was awarded the VC:

"On 25 June 1916 near Colonne, France, Lieutenant Henry-Batten-Pooll was in command of a raiding party when, on entering the enemy's lines he was severely wounded by a bomb which broke and mutilated all the fingers of his right hand. In spite of this he continued to direct operations with unflinching courage. Half an hour later during the withdrawal, while personally assisting in the rescue of other wounded men, he received two further wounds, but refusing assistance, he walked to within 100 yards of our lines when he fainted and was carried in by the covering party."

Shortly afterwards he was promoted to the rank of captain.

He was awarded the Military Cross for his actions at Cherisy on 3 May 1917 when he rallied his men and led the attack, successfully reaching and holding the objective and inflicting heavy losses on the enemy. After service as an aide-de-camp, he returned to the 2nd Munsters in August 1917, taken prisoner at Passchendaele in November 1917 and repatriated in March 1918. He then acted as a deputy assistant provost marshal and in 1919 as a liaison officer to the North Russian Expeditionary Force.

== Later life ==
He retired from the army in April 1920 and attended Balliol College, Oxford from 1922 to 1925, obtaining a Diploma in Agriculture and Rural Economics.

He died on 21 January 1971 aged 79 and was buried in St Lawrence's Parish Churchyard, Woolverton, Somerset.

His Victoria Cross is in the collections of the National Army Museum, Chelsea, London.

== Bibliography ==
- Gliddon, Gerald (2004) [2012]. VCs of the First World War: Cambrai 1917. The History Press. ISBN 978-0-75-247668-1.
