= Rearguard Affair of Étreux =

1914 battle on the Western Front of World War I

- Part of the Great Retreat on the Western Front of World War I
| Date | 27 August 1914 |
| Location | Étreux, France 49°59′42″N 03°39′27″E |
| Result | German victory |

Belligerents
| United Kingdom | German Empire |

Commanders and leaders
| (United Kingdom) Sir Horace Smith-Dorrien | (German Empire) Alexander von Kluck (German Empire) Karl von Bülow |

Strength
| around 800 with two field guns | 4,000–5,000 |

Casualties and losses
| around 600 killed and wounded, 240 men and 4 officers (POW) | as many as 1,500 |
- Étreux, a commune in the Aisne department, Hauts-de-France, northern France

The Rearguard Affair of Étreux was fought at Étreux by the British Expeditionary Force during the Great Retreat on the Western Front in 1914.

== Background ==
The German 2nd Army commander General Karl von Bülow had ordered a rapid pursuit after the battles of 21–24 August against the French Fifth Army and the British Expeditionary Force (BEF). The 1st and 2nd Armies were sent to the south-west to gain the left flank of the Allied line. After encountering "especially obstinate" resistance at Marbaix and Le Grand-Fayt, the German Imperial Army's X (Reserve) Corps had been ordered to continue its advance to the south-west. The 2nd Royal Munster Fusiliers had been ordered to hold its ground at all costs, in their first action in France.

== Battle ==
Less than a battalion strength, just 3 companies of the 2nd Battalion of The Royal Munster Fusiliers from Ireland supported by a couple of field guns halted the advance of the German Army for fourteen hours in the area of Oisny and Étreux during the retreat from Mons on 27 August.

Under continual pressure from German attacks the Munsters fell back to an orchard near the village of Étreux. As night fell on the evening of the 27 August, they found themselves surrounded by the Germans. Having exhausted their ammunition they surrendered. In their action at Ètreux only four officers and 240 other ranks of the 2nd Munsters survived but the battalion delayed German pursuit of the British I Corps, gaining time for the British Expeditionary Force to escape. The 2nd Munsters were outnumbered at odds of over 6:1 and when finally defeated, the survivors were congratulated on their bravery by the German soldiers they had fought. The German X (Reserve) Corps continued its advance towards Wassigny and Étreux on 27 August, where its constituent 19th (Reserve) Division reported that it had "scattered a British battalion".
