= Parados =

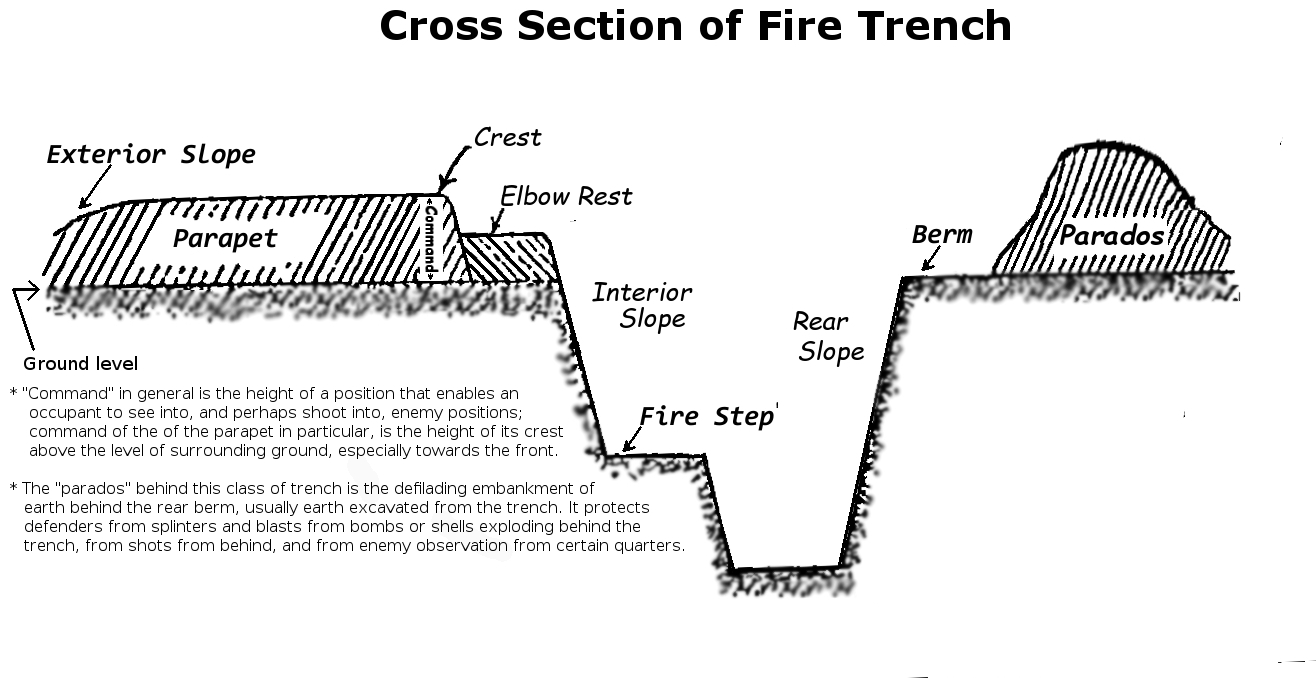
Military trench schematic, showing parados

A parados is a bank of earth built behind a trench or military emplacement to protect soldiers from attack from the rear or from enfiladement.

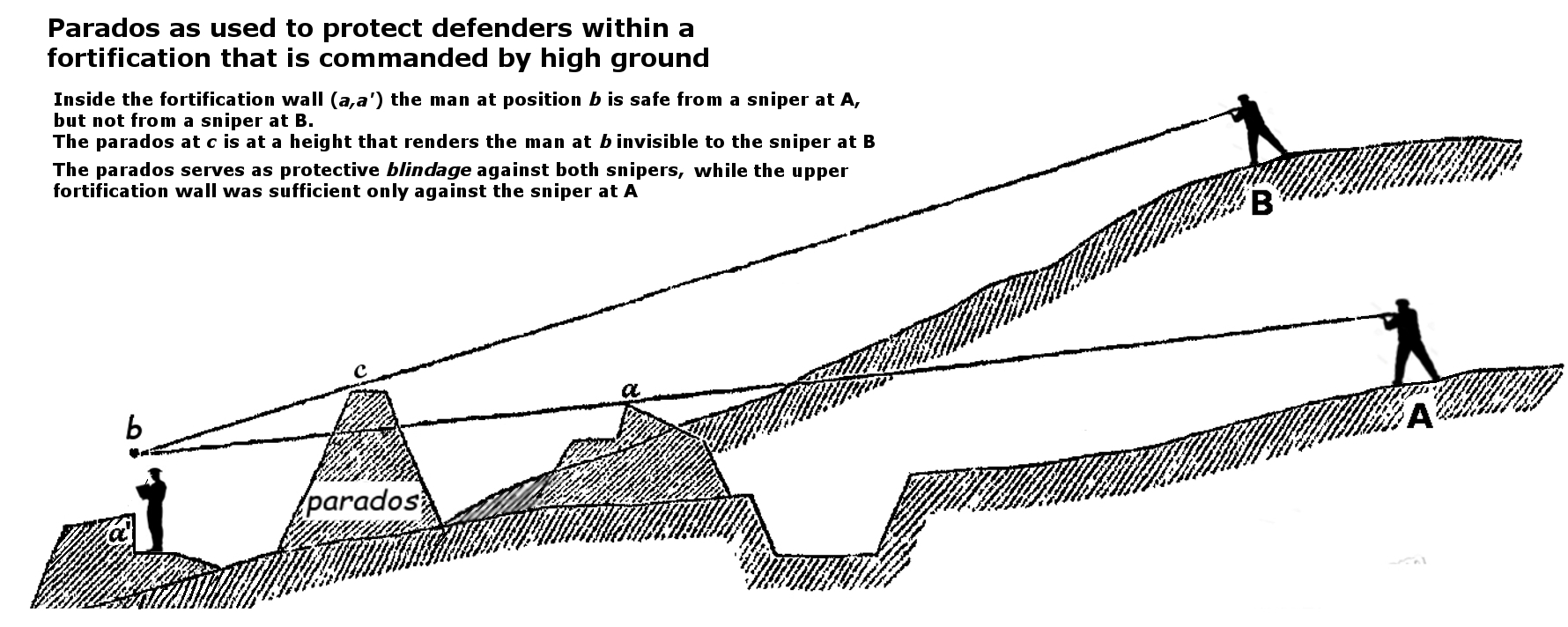
Parados defilading a fortification
