= Robert Stuart Baynes =

British Army officer

Lieutenant-General Robert Stuart Baynes
- Died: 7 October 1902; Haywards Heath
- Military career
- Allegiance: United Kingdom
- Branch: British Army
- Service years: 1843–1881
- Rank: Lieutenant-General
- Unit: King's Liverpool Regiment
- Conflicts: Crimean War; Indian Rebellion of 1857

Lieutenant-General Robert Stuart Baynes (died 7 October 1902) was a British Army officer.

== Career ==
Baynes was the son of the diplomat Sir Edward Stuart Baynes, KCMG. He entered the army as ensign in 1843, was promoted to lieutenant in 1846, and to captain in 1853. He first saw active service in the Crimea as a captain of the Mounted Staff Corps, took part in the siege of Sevastopol, and later served as a military magistrate. For these services he was mentioned in despatches, received the Crimea Medal with clasp for Sevastopol, the fifth class of the Order of Medjidie, and a brevet promotion to major.

After promotion to the substantive rank of major in 1856, he went to British India, where he took part in suppressing the Indian Rebellion of 1857. With a force consisting of two horse artillery guns, 150 men of the 8th Regiment, and a detachment of Punjab cavalry, he surprised the garrison and took the fort of Phillur, on the Sutlej. With the 8th he also served at the Siege of Delhi (June to September 1857), when during an assault he was dangerously wounded. As a result, he had to amputate his leg. For he service, he received the Indian Mutiny Medal and the brevet rank of lieutenant-colonel.

He became colonel in 1865, major-general in 1870, and lieutenant-general in 1881, when he retired from the army.

In retirement, he was colonel of the Royal Munster Fusiliers from 1895 to 1899, and of his old regiment the King's Liverpool Regiment from 1899 until his death.

He died at Norton Lees, Haywards Heath on 7 October 1902.

Military offices
Preceded by General Henry Meade Hamilton	Colonel of the Royal Munster Fusiliers; 1895–1899	Succeeded by Lt.-General William Rickman
Preceded by General George William Powlett Bingham	Colonel of the King's Liverpool Regiment; 1899–1902	Succeeded by Lt.-General George Edward Baynes
