= Ireland and World War I =

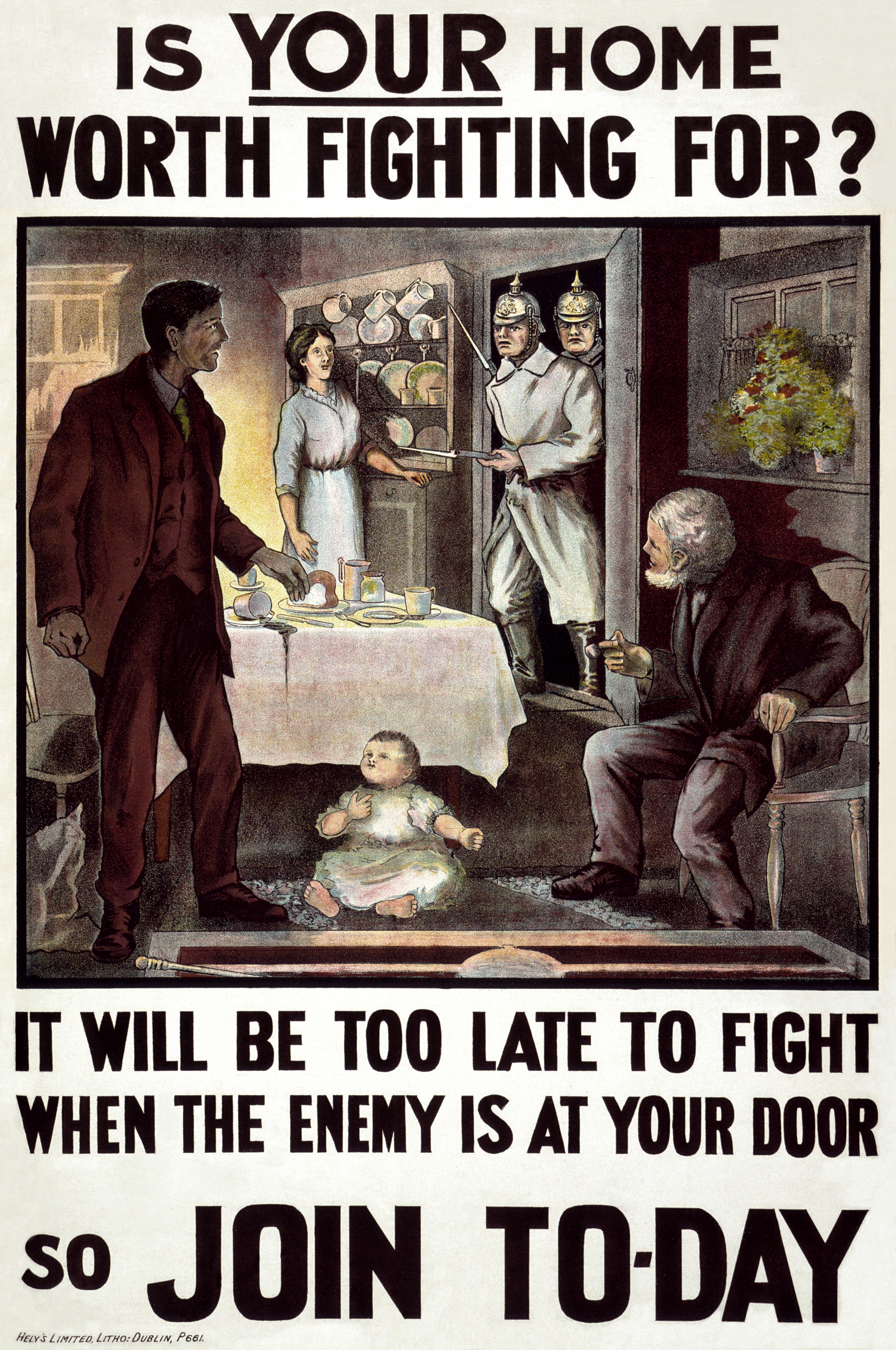
Irish World War I propaganda recruitment poster, c. 1915, by Hely's Limited, Dublin

During World War I (1914–1918), Ireland was part of the United Kingdom of Great Britain and Ireland, which entered the war in August 1914 as one of the Entente Powers, along with France and Russia. In part as an effect of chain ganging, the UK decided due to geopolitical power issues to declare war on the Central Powers, consisting of Germany, Austria-Hungary, and later the Ottoman Empire and Bulgaria.

Occurring during Ireland's revolutionary period, the Irish people's experience of the war was complex and its memory of it divisive. At the outbreak of the war, most Irish people, regardless of political affiliation, supported the war in much the same way as their British counterparts, and both nationalist and unionist leaders initially backed the British war effort. Irishmen, both Catholic and Protestant, served extensively in the British forces, many in three specially raised divisions, while others served in the armies of the British dominions and the United States, John T. Prout being an example of the latter. Over 200,000 men from Ireland fought in the war, in several theatres. About 30,000 died serving in Irish regiments of the British forces, and as many as 49,400 may have died altogether.

In 1916, Irish republicans took the opportunity of the ongoing war to proclaim an independent Irish Republic and launch an armed rebellion against British rule in Dublin, which Germany attempted to aid. In addition, Britain's intention to impose conscription in Ireland in 1918 provoked widespread resistance and, as a result, remained unimplemented.

After the end of the Great War, Irish republicans won the 1918 general election and declared Irish independence. This led to the Irish War of Independence (1919–1922), fought between the Irish Republican Army (IRA) and British forces. Ex-servicemen fought for both sides. During the War of Independence, the British government partitioned Ireland. This phase of conflict ended with the Anglo-Irish Treaty which split Sinn Féin and the IRA, leading to the Irish Civil War (1922–1923) between pro-treaty and anti-treaty forces. The pro-treaty forces were victorious, with most of the island becoming the Irish Free State.

The remarks attributed to National Volunteer and poet, Francis Ledwidge, who was to die in preparation of the Third Battle of Ypres in 1917, perhaps best exemplifies the changing Irish nationalist sentiment towards enlisting, the War, and to the Germans and British.

"I joined the British Army because she stood between Ireland and an enemy common to our civilization, and I would not have her say that she defended us while we did nothing at home but pass resolutions".

After the leaders of the 1916 Easter Rising – including his friend and literary mentor Thomas MacDonagh – were executed during his military leave, he said:

"If someone were to tell me now that the Germans were coming in over our back wall, I wouldn't lift a finger to stop them. They could come!"

== Prelude to the Great War ==
=== Political climate in Ireland ===
The First World War was immediately preceded in Ireland by a major political crisis over Home Rule or Irish self-government.

The Government of Ireland Act 1914 received royal assent on 18 September 1914. However, the operation of this Act was suspended for the duration of the war. Moreover, it was resisted fiercely by Unionists, concentrated in Ulster. In 1913, they had formed an armed militia, the Ulster Volunteers, to resist the implementation of Home Rule or to exclude Ulster itself from the settlement. Nationalists in response formed a rival militia the Irish Volunteers, to "defend the constitutional rights of the Irish people", and to put pressure on Britain to keep its promise of Home Rule. Conflict between the two armed groups looked possible in the early months of 1914. The outbreak of war temporarily defused this crisis.

=== Nationalist response ===
On 3 August 1914, John Redmond, the leader of the Irish Parliamentary Party, declared in the House of Commons, "the government may withdraw every one of their troops from Ireland and rely that the coast of Ireland will be defended from foreign invasion by her armed sons". His 'Home Defence' initiative was widely acclaimed, though not by all of the Irish Volunteers. After Unionist leader Edward Carson urged Ulster Volunteers on 3 September to enlist in their new Ulster division and with the Home Rule Bill passing into law on 17 September, Redmond found himself under pressure to demonstrate commitment. On 20 September, addressing a muster of Volunteers in Woodenbridge, County Wicklow, he called upon them to enlist in existing Irish regiments of the British army, in support of the Allied war effort:

The interests of Ireland—of the whole of Ireland—are at stake in this war. This war is undertaken in the defence of the highest principles of religion and morality and right, and it would be a disgrace for ever to our country and a reproach to her manhood and a denial of the lessons of her history if young Ireland confined their efforts to remaining at home to defend the shores of Ireland from an unlikely invasion, and to shrinking from the duty of proving on the field of battle that gallantry and courage which has distinguished our race all through its history. I say to you, therefore, your duty is twofold. I am glad to see such magnificent material for soldiers around me, and I say to you: "Go on drilling and make yourself efficient for the Work, and then account yourselves as men, not only for Ireland itself, but wherever the fighting line extends, in defence of right, of freedom, and religion in this war . It would be a disgrace forever to our country otherwise

—

Redmond's call came at a time of heightened emotions as the swift German advance through neutral Belgium was also threatening Paris. Redmond believed that Imperial Germany's hegemony and military expansion threatened the freedom of Europe and that it was Ireland's duty, having achieved future self-government through the passing of the Home Rule Bill. Many other parliamentary leaders, such as William O'Brien, Thomas O’Donnell, and Joseph Devlin, supported Redmond's decision. Redmond's own son, William Redmond, enlisted, as did his brother Major Willie Redmond MP, despite being aged over 50 years. They were among a group of five Irish MPs who enlisted, the others being J. L. Esmonde, Stephen Gwynn, and D. D. Sheehan, as well as former MP Tom Kettle. Initially, the Catholic Church in Ireland was also supportive of the War under the slogan of "save Catholic Belgium".

The 180,000 Irish Volunteers were divided by Redmond's support for the British war effort. A large majority followed him, forming the National Volunteers. About 25,000 of these went on to serve in Irish regiments of the New British Army during the war. The remaining 10,000 Volunteers under Eoin MacNeill declared they would keep their organisation together and in Ireland until Home Rule was passed. A further 100,000 or more men, who were not members of the National Volunteers, enlisted from around Ireland in the New Army divisions for the duration of the war.

However, the more radical fringe of Irish nationalism, the remaining Irish Volunteers, and the secretive Irish Republican Brotherhood, rejected Irish participation in the war on Britain's side. They actively opposed enlistment and in secret, elements of them prepared an armed insurrection against British rule in Ireland which would later be known as the 1916 Easter Rising.

Redmond gave a speech in opposition to the Easter Rising in which he described it as a 'German intrigue'. His pleas, and Dillon's, that the rebels be treated leniently were ignored by the Irish public, and would later cost his party in the election following the War, as well as being of consequence to subsequent events such as the British military actions under martial law following the Easter Rising and the Conscription Crisis of 1918. Sinn Féin won the majority of seats (73 out of 105 seats) in the 1918 general election while the Irish Parliamentary Party and the Unionist Party won 6 and 22 seats respectively.

=== Unionist response ===
Unionist leader Edward Carson promised immediate Unionist support for the war effort. He was motivated in this by two main factors, one being genuine identification with the British Empire, another being a desire to demonstrate the loyalty of Unionists to the British government, despite having formed an armed militia in defiance of it over Home Rule.

At this time, Herbert Kitchener was in the process of raising a New Service Army in support of the relatively small pre-war regular Army. The Unionists were granted their own Division, the 36th (Ulster) Division which had its own reserve militia officers and its own symbols. It was largely recruited from the Ulster Volunteer force and had a strongly Protestant and unionist identity.

Redmond requested the War Office to allow the formation of a separate Irish Brigade as had been done for the Ulster Volunteers. The British Government, however, was suspicious of Redmond after he declared to the Volunteers that they would return as an armed and trained Irish Army by the end of 1915 to resist Ulster's opposition to Home Rule. Eventually he was granted the gesture of the 16th (Irish) Division. However, with the exception of its Irish General William Hickie and unlike the 36th (Ulster) Division, the 16th was led by English officers. Most Irish recruits lacked military training to act as officers.

According to David Lloyd George, Nationalist women had embroidered a green flag depicting the Celtic harp for the Irish division, and Unionist women had embroidered for the Ulster Division a flag emblazoned with the Red Hand of Ulster. Kitchener ordered the green flag with the harp to be taken away but he allowed the Ulster Division to keep their flag: "Ireland was deeply hurt. Her pride was cut to the quick, her sense of fair play was outraged, her sympathy with the Holy War against the military dictatorship of Europe was killed, and John Redmond's heart was broken". Lloyd George argued that thereafter, "the effort of Irish Nationalism to reconcile England and Ireland by uniting the two peoples in a common effort for the oppressed of another land failed, and Lord Kitchener's sinister order constituted the first word in a new chapter of Irish history".

In the judgement of one historian, "Both political camps [nationalist and unionist] expected the gratitude of the British administration for their willingness to sacrifice themselves and the rank and file of their parties. Neither foresaw that in the First World War, all special interests would be expendable".

== Recruitment ==
A total of 206,000 Irishmen served in the British forces during the war. Of these,

- 58,000 were already enlisted in the British Regular Army or Navy before the war broke out, including:
  - 21,000 serving regular soldiers, 18,000 reservists, 12,000 in the Special Reserve, 5,000 Naval ratings and 2,000 officers.
- 130,000 were service volunteers recruited from Ireland for the duration of the war, including:
  - 24,000 from the National Volunteers.
  - 26,000 from the Ulster Volunteers.
  - 80,000 with no experience in either of the paramilitary groups.

Of the wartime recruits, 137,000 went to the British Army, 6,000 to the Royal Navy, and 4,000 to the Royal Air Force.

According to historian David Fitzpatrick, "The proportion of eligible men who volunteered was well below that in Britain [...] even so, the participation of 200,000 Irishmen was proportionately the greatest deployment of armed manpower in the history of Irish militarism". The recruitment rate in Ulster matched that of Britain itself, Leinster and Munster were about two-thirds of the British rate of recruitment, and Connacht lagged behind them. Overall, Protestants volunteered in higher proportions than Catholics, although in Ulster Catholics volunteered just as often as Protestants.

At the beginning of the war, the recruitment campaigns in Ireland were similar to those used in Great Britain. However, after the creation of the Central Council for the Organisation of Recruiting in Ireland (CCORI) in April 1915, campaigns for recruitment in Ireland became more targeted toward Irishmen. Soon after the formation of the CCORI, the Department for Recruiting in Ireland became the prominent recruiting force in October 1915. Recruitment posters became "the locus for the recruiting campaign," writes Nuala Johnson. Johnson in her book Ireland, the Great War and the Geography of Remembrance identifies 5 key themes in Irish WWI recruitment posters: safe work, rural, masculinity, Christianity, and positive stereotyping. Campaigns proved effective, and few nationalists deserted the war efforts in hopes they would prove to Britain Ireland's ability to self-govern. Fitzpatrick finds that following the Easter rising of 1916, rebels were at first the subjects of dissent, however, the retaliation of the British government against nationalists quickly redirected anger towards Britain. He writes, "in the aftermath of the rebellion, the pro-war consensus in Ireland was shattered." The Irish Recruitment Council (IRC) formed in 1918 was the first recruitment organization to form following the Easter Rising "at a time when most Irish people were either war-weary or openly hostile to British rule," writes Brendan Maartens in Oxford's The English Historical Review. While the organization was created to increase enlistment in the war, the IRC was also designed to unite the divisions within Ireland. Utilizing 'Common Christianity,' the IRC attempted to provide both the Protestants and Catholics with a reason to join the army and maintain peace.

The voluntary recruitment figures were: 44,000 Irishmen enlisted in 1914 and 45,000 followed in 1915, but this dropped to 19,000 in 1916 and 14,000 in 1917. The 1918 figure has been given as between 11,000 and 15,655; between August and November 1918 alone 9,845 were recruited.

=== Decline in recruitment ===
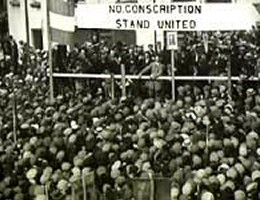
John Dillon addresses an anti-conscription rally, 1918.

Several factors contributed to the decline in recruitment after 1916. One was the heavy casualties suffered by Irish units in the war. The 10th Irish Division suffered very heavy losses during the Gallipoli campaign in 1915, while the 16th and 36th Divisions were shattered at the Battle of the Somme in 1916.

A second important factor was the Catholic Church's condemnation of the war in July 1915. Pope Benedict XV issued an encyclical calling on all powers to end the war and come to an agreement. As a result, the Irish Catholic Bishops publicly called on Redmond to withdraw Irish support for the war.

Thirdly, Irish troops in the British Army appear to have been treated with particular harshness even by the standards of the time. They constituted just two per cent of the membership of the force, yet they were the recipients of eight per cent (271) of all death sentences imposed by its courts-martial. Estimates on the number of executed ranging from 25 to 30 of the Irish war dead were victims of court martial executions. Opposition to the war in Ireland may have therefore been influenced by perceived discrimination by British High Command against Irish soldiers, although within the Irish units death sentences were meted out in roughly equal proportions against Catholic and Protestant servicemen. On average one British soldier out of every 3,000 of their troops that died in the war did so due to being court martialed and executed by firing squad, compared to the much higher one out of every 600 of the Irish troops that died. Out of the total that were executed, 26 have since been retroactively pardoned.

The fourth and perhaps most important reason was the rise of radical nationalism after the Easter Rising of 1916—an insurrection in Dublin by nationalists that left around 500 dead.

Unlike the rest of the United Kingdom, conscription was never imposed on Ireland, a position it held with the British dominion of Australia in WWI. In the British dominion of Canada after conscription began there was a conscription crisis, in 1917, following this, when Irish conscription was proposed in the spring of 1918 (following the huge German spring offensive), it led to the Conscription Crisis of 1918, a mass assembly of civil disobedience and the proposal was dropped in May after the American entry into the War had helped stem the German advance.

=== German support to separatists ===
In a similar fashion to the nascent Indian Independence Movement, the Irish rebels collaborated with their Indian counterparts and mutually sought help from Germany during the War. The Germans sent a shipment of over 20,000 captured Mosin–Nagant Russian rifles, 10 machine guns and 4 million rounds of ammunition to aid the Irish Easter Rising. However the shipment was lost when the ship, the SS Libau, posing as the SS Aud was intercepted and scuttled by her captain off Fenit, County Kerry. After the Rising, they were in communication to send another, much larger weapons cache to Ireland in 1917, but the plan never came together. Roger Casement tried to recruit a rebel unit from Irish prisoners of war in German captivity. The "Irish Brigade" drew only 55 recruits, however.

== Irish Divisions ==
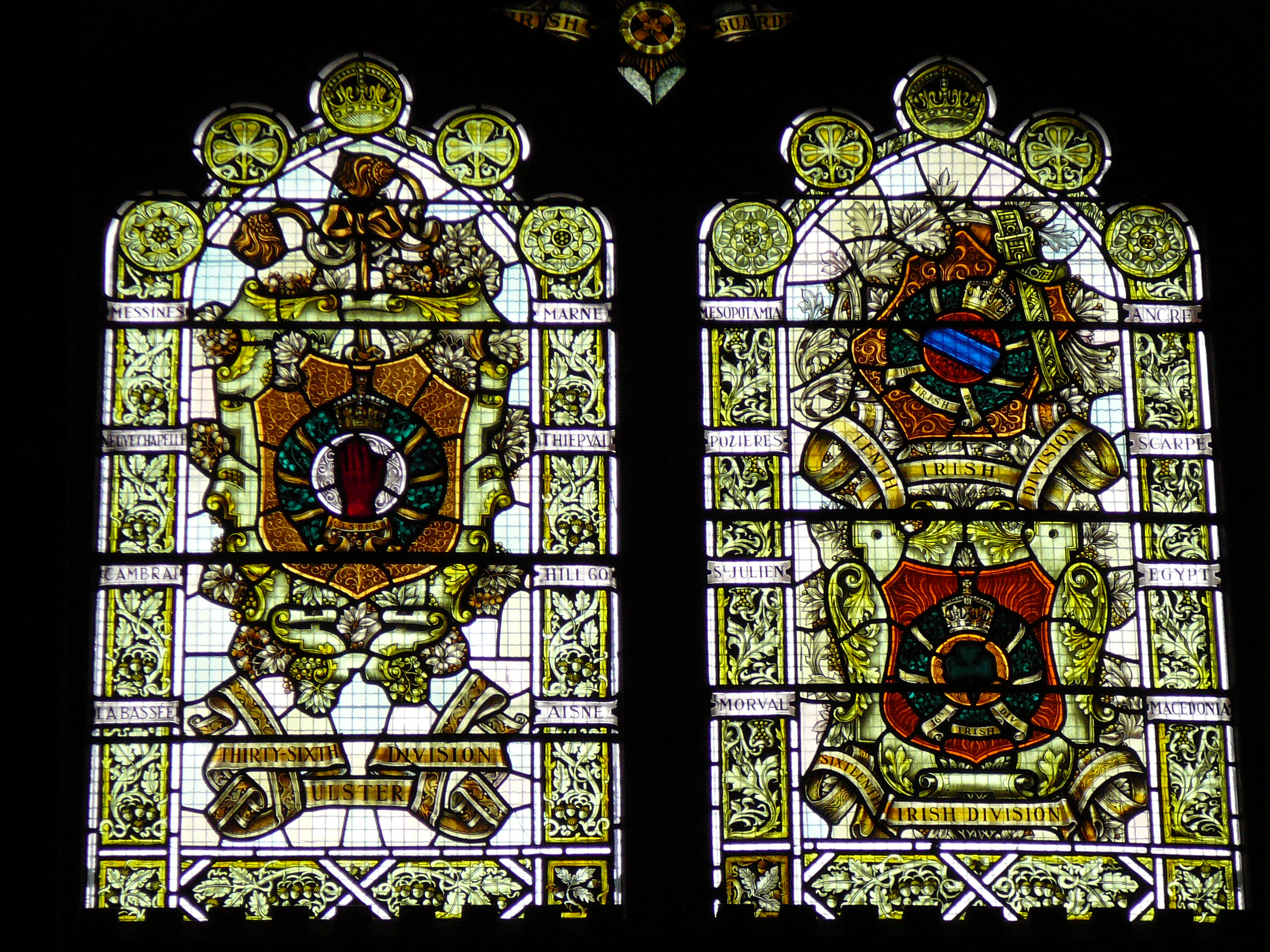
The Derry Guildhall stained-glass window which commemorates the Three Irish Divisions, left the 36th, right the 10th and 16th

Of the Irish men who enlisted in the first year of the War, half were from what is now the Republic of Ireland; the other half were from what is now Northern Ireland. They joined new battalions of the eight regiments existing in Ireland.

These battalions were assigned to brigades of the 10th (Irish) Division, the 16th (Irish) Division, and the 36th (Ulster) Division of Kitchener's New Service Army, as well as to brigades of other United Kingdom Divisions during the course of the war.

A proportion of the Irish National Volunteers (INV) enlisted with regiments of both the 10th and 16th Divisions, but were predominantly in the 16th division, members of the Ulster Volunteers (UVF), joined regiments of the 36th Division. Military historian Timothy Bowman states that 'While Kitchener saw the UVF as an efficient military force and was prepared to offer concessions to secure the services of UVF personnel in the British army his view of the INV was very different. The INV were, even in comparison to the UVF, an inefficient military force in 1914, lacked trained officers, finances and equipment. Kitchener was certainly not inclined to, as he saw it, waste valuable officers and equipment on such a force which, at best, would relieve Territorial units from garrison duties and, at worst, would provide Irish Nationalists with the ability [by training them in the means of War] to enforce Home Rule [when they returned] on their own terms'.

In spite of these criticisms, the 16th division gained a reputation as first-class shock troops during engagements in 1916.

The Irish regiments of the three divisions and the BEF as a whole appear to have suffered from few serious disciplinary or morale problems during March to November 1918.

=== 10th Division ===
The 10th (Irish) Division, was one of Kitchener's New Army K1 Army Group divisions formed in August 1914. Raised largely in Ireland from the Irish National Volunteers, it fought at Gallipoli, Salonika and Palestine and was the first Irish Division to take the field in war, under the command of Irish Lieutenant General Bryan Mahon and was the most travelled of the Irish formations.

Sent to Gallipoli it participated on 7 August 1915 in the disastrous landing at Cape Helles and the August offensive. Some battalions of the division were engaged at Chunuk Bair. In September when the Suvla front became a stalemate, the division was moved to Salonika where it fought Bulgarian troops and remained for two years. In September 1917 the division transferred to Egypt where it joined the XX Corps of the Egyptian Expeditionary Force. The division fought in the Third Battle of Gaza which succeeded in breaking the resistance of the Turkish defenders in southern Palestine.

The 10th Division was persistently under-strength due to heavy losses and "sluggish enlistment" and as a result was filled up early on with drafts from England. Because of this, historian Charles Townshend has suggested that, "it was an Irish unit in name only" and was the "least politicised of the three [Divisions] raised in Ireland". The division was furthermore broken up in 1918, split between the Middle East and Western Front. Military historian Timothy Bowman points out: 'Following the German spring offensive, in a situation where the BEF was facing serious manpower problems on the Western Front, saw that six Irish battalions were released from the Middle East for service on the Western Front, so that the experience of its Service battalions could be spread through other formations, their place being taken by Indian Army battalions. A second practical problem for the 10th Division to be split up was widespread malaria, with the likelihood of it being permanently unfit for action.

=== 16th Division ===
The 16th (Irish) Division was a K2 Army Group division of Kitchener's New Army, formed in Ireland in September 1914 and raised around a core of the National Volunteers. The division began forming towards the end of 1914 after Irish recruits first filled the ranks of the 10th Division. Initial training began in Ireland. It moved to England for more intensive training in September 1915. In December the division moved to France, joining the British Expeditionary Force (BEF), under the command of Irish Major General William Hickie, and spent the duration of the war in action on the Western Front.

Until March 1916 the division was part of IV Corps, commanded by the staunch unionist Henry Wilson. Wilson, who had called the division "Johnnie Redmond's pets", inspected them over the course of a few days over Christmas 1915, noting that they "appear to be inferior" and that "at least 50p.c. are quite useless, old whiskey-sodden militiamen". Hickie agreed that he had "a political Divn of riff raff Redmondites". Wilson thought 47th brigade had "old officers, old & useless men, very bad musketry, rotten boots, and altogether a very poor show". Wilson reported to the Army Commander Monro (6 January) that the division, despite having been training since September–October 1914, would not be fit to serve in an active part of the line for six weeks. Although political prejudice probably played a part in Wilson's views, he also attributed much of the difference in quality between his divisions to training, especially of officers, in which he took a keen personal interest, opposing Haig's wish to delegate training from corps to division level.

Major General William Hickie took over from Lt. General Sir Lawrence Parsons in December 1915. Hickie was, in public, much more diplomatic and tactful than his predecessors and spoke of the pride which his new command gave him.

At Loos in January and February 1916 they got their introduction to trench warfare and suffered greatly in the Battle of Hulluch, 27–29 April, during the Easter Rising. They raided German trenches all through May and June, and in late July were moved to the Somme Valley where they were intensively engaged in the Battle of the Somme. The 16th division was critical in capturing the towns of Guillemont and Ginchy (both part of the Battle of the Somme), though they suffered massive casualties. A London newspaper headlined How the Irish took Ginchy – Splendid daring of the Irish troops The former Nationalist MP for East Tyrone, lawyer and economics professor at UCD, Tom Kettle was killed in this battle. During these two successful actions between 1 and 10 September its casualties amounted to 224 officers and 4,090 men; despite these very heavy losses the division gained a reputation as first-class shock troops.

Out of a total of 10,845 men, it had lost 3,491 on the Loos sector between January and the end of May 1916, including heavy casualties from bombardment and a heavy chlorine and phosgene Gas attack at Hulluch in April. Bloodletting of this order was fatal to the division's character, and it had to be refilled by male conscripts from England.

In early 1917, the division took a major part in the Battle of Messines alongside the 36th (Ulster) Division, adding duly to both their recognition and reputation. Their major actions ended in the summer of 1917 at the Battle of Passchendaele after moving under General Hubert Gough's Fifth Army command. In July 1917 during the Third Battle of Ypres, although both divisions were totally exhausted after 13 days of moving heavy equipment under heavy shelling he ordered their battalions advance through deep mud towards well fortified German positions left untouched by totally inadequate artillery preparation. By mid-August, the 16th had suffered over 4,200 casualties and the 36th had suffered almost 3,600 casualties, or more than 50 percent of their numbers. General Gough was later dismissed at the start of April 1918.

The 16th Division held an exposed position since early 1918 at Ronssoy where they suffered heavy losses during the German March Spring Offensive and in the retreat which followed, being practically wiped out when they helped to finally halt the German attack prior to the Battle of Hamel. The decision was then made to break up the division, the three surviving Service battalions posted to other formations. In June the division was "reconstituted" in England. The "16th Division" which returned to France on 27 July contained 5 English Battalions, 2 Scottish Battalions and 1 Welsh Battalion. The only original Battalion left was the 5th Royal Irish Fusiliers.

The dispersion of the Irish battalions throughout the BEF in 1918, despite its practical considerations, does appear to suggest that the Irish units were increasingly distrusted by the military authorities.

=== 36th Division ===
The 36th (Ulster) Division was a K6 Army Group division of Lord Kitchener's New Army formed in September 1914. Originally called the Ulster Division, it was made up of members of the Ulster Volunteer Force who formed thirteen additional battalions for three existing Irish regiments; the Royal Irish Fusiliers, the Royal Irish Rifles and the Royal Inniskilling Fusiliers. The division served on the Western Front for the duration of the war. Its insignia was the Red Hand of Ulster. The division was authorised on 28 October 1914. It was based on the formation and membership of the Ulster Volunteer Force to which a London-based artillery unit was added. It contained men from all nine counties of Ulster.

After training moved to France early October 1915. The 36th, under Major General Oliver Nugent, was one of the few divisions to make significant gains on the first day on the Somme in July 1916, when it attacked between the Ancre and Thiepval against a position known as the Schwaben Redoubt, according to military historian Martin Middlebrook. During the Battle of the Somme the Ulster Division was the only division of X Corps to have achieved its objectives on the opening day of the battle. This came at a heavy price, however, with the division suffering, in just two days of fighting, 5,500 officers and men, killed, wounded or missing.

War correspondent Philip Gibbs said of the division, ‘'Their attack was one of the finest displays of human courage in the world'’. Of nine Victoria Crosses awarded to British forces in the battle, four were given to 36th Division soldiers. The division's other battle engagements included: the Battle of Cambrai, Battle of Messines, Battle of Ypres (1917), Battle of Ypres (1918), Battle of Courtrai, Battle of the St Quentin Canal.

The 36th (Ulster) Division, on the other hand, had a variable performance and after it was badly cut-up and collapsed during the March 1918 spring offensive, the division in this case was reorganised and its battalions brought up to strength.

Both the 16th and 36th divisions had also lost much of their original character by the end of the war. According to David Fitzpatrick, "Eventually heavy casualties and insufficient recruitment ensured that all three Irish Divisions were restocked with British recruits and effectively dismembered".

=== Irish regiments ===
The Childers Reforms linked regiments to recruiting districts – in the case of Ireland to eight regimental recruiting areas, see end, also. Militarily, the whole of Ireland was administered as a separate command with Command Headquarters in the old Royal Military Infirmary building at Parkgate (Phoenix Park) Dublin, directly under the War Office in London.

Irish regiments engaged in the war were in the first place the old professional regiments, their battalions raised and garrisoned in Ireland, serving with the regular British army. They were: Royal Irish Regiment, Royal Inniskilling Fusiliers, Royal Irish Rifles, Princess Victoria's (Royal Irish Fusiliers), Connaught Rangers, Prince of Wales's Leinster Regiment (Royal Canadians), Royal Dublin Fusiliers and Royal Munster Fusiliers.

These regiments were assigned to Brigades of the following United Kingdom Divisions: the 1st, 6th, 14th, 24th, 27th, 29th, 30th, 31st, 34th, 50th, 57th, 66th Divisions.

After the outbreak of hostilities in August 1914 the regimental garrisons raised additional new service battalions in Ireland for voluntary enlistment in the three New Irish Divisions of Kitchener's New Service Army In March 1918 after the 10th and 16th Irish Divisions were broken up due to heavy casualties, their remaining New Service Battalions were dispersed throughout the above United Kingdom Divisions.

Irishmen also enlisted in other Irish regiments of the regular British army based elsewhere in England, Scotland and Wales (some Irish in name only). These included four regular cavalry regiments (the 4th (Royal Irish) Dragoon Guards, the 5th (Royal Irish) Lancers, the 6th (Inniskilling) Dragoons, and the 8th (King's Royal Irish) Hussars), a regular infantry regiment (the Irish Guards), two cavalry regiments of the Special Reserve (the North Irish Horse and the South Irish Horse), two units of the Territorial Force (the Liverpool Irish and the London Irish Rifles) and the war-raised Tyneside Irish Brigade of Kitchener's Army. Many Irish immigrants in other parts of the world also joined local Irish units, such as Canada's 199th (Duchess of Connaught's Own Irish Rangers) Battalion, CEF, or in the United States in the Irish American 69th Infantry Regiment.

== Theatres of War ==
=== Western Front ===
==== First shot ====
The first United Kingdom engagement in Europe of the War was made by the 4th Royal Irish Dragoon Guards on 22 August 1914. They encountered several German cavalrymen on patrol near Mons, when Corporal Edward Thomas had the distinction of firing the first British army shot in Europe in the War, during which some of the Germans were killed and others captured.

==== Mons, Givenchy, 1914 ====
The Germans were pushing their advance through Belgium to encircle Paris within three weeks (Schlieffen Plan), when on 27 August the 2nd Battalion Royal Munster Fusiliers was chosen for the arduous task of forming the rearguard to cover the retreat of the British Expeditionary Force during the Battle of Mons. The Munsters were only to retreat if ordered. They made an epic stand losing 9 officers and 87 other ranks holding out in a famous action at the village of Étreux, many others surrounded and taken prisoner. They stemmed the Germans who were five or six times their strength for over a day, allowing their 1st Division to escape.

When the scattered battalion reassembled on 29 August it was down to a disastrous 5 officers and 196 others. These were withdrawn and by November recruits from home brought its strength up to over 800 men. The battalion was moved south to the Festubert sector in France on 22 November to fill a gap by taking two lines of trenches. There were 200 casualties in the first 10 minutes of heavy fire. On 25 January, the Kaiser's birthday, the Germans tried unsuccessfully to break through with terrific shellfire. There then followed three months of rebuilding and training the battalion.

The Irish Guards also suffered heavily in battle of Mons, like the Munsters, having to fight a rearguard action while withdrawing from Bois de l'Haut. They took over 300 casualties but managed to retreat intact.

The Munsters' and Irish Guards' experience was typical of the decimation of the highly trained pre-war British Army in the campaigns of 1914 in France and Belgium. By the end of 1914, those regiments deployed in the original British Expeditionary Force had been shattered by very heavy casualties. On average, in each battalion of 1,000 men, only one officer and 30 men remained unscathed. For this reason, it was necessary to deploy, first reservists to replace casualties, and then the wartime volunteers of Kitchener's New Army (including the 10th, 16th and 36th Irish Divisions), in order to fight a war of an unprecedented scale.

==== St Julien, 1915 ====
While the 2nd Battle of Ypres raged in May the 2nd Royal Dublin Fusiliers were nearly wiped out as a result of a German-initiated poison gas attack. There were 666 personnel at the outset and 21 survived.

At the end of 1915 the 16th (Irish) Division entered the trenches on the Western Front under the command of Irish Major-General William Hickie.

==== Dublin, 1916 ====
As the number of Irish war casualties increased with little prospect of early victory, the Irish Volunteers continued to train and resisted any attempt to disarm them. They organised an Easter Rising in Dublin for 24 April. Roughly 1,200 Volunteers and Irish Citizen Army members took over the city centre. About 5,000 troops in the Dublin area were deployed to suppress the rebellion. An additional 1,000 were immediately sent from Belfast and further thousands were dispatched from Athlone, The Curragh and England. The 4th, 5th and 10th Royal Dublin Fusiliers took part, as did a number of officers and soldiers who were on leave in Dublin at the time. By the end of the week, 16,000 British troops had been deployed to Dublin. Casualties were 62 rebels killed, 132 British Army and Police dead and 368 wounded. Another 270 civilians were killed and over 2,000 wounded. In all, just 16 police and 22 of the British soldiers killed were Irishmen. Another 16 rebels, the rebel leaders - the seven signatories of the Proclamation of Irish Independence, Padraig Pearse, James Connolly, Éamonn Ceannt, Thomas James Clarke, Seán MacDiarmada, Thomas MacDonagh, and Joseph Mary Plunkett as well as nine others - were executed by the British Army, without trial, after the Rising.

It was generally accepted that the Irish Volunteers fought bravely and honourably. Prime Minister Asquith told the House of Commons that "they fought bravely and did not resort to outrage." The series of executions helped to swing Nationalist support away from the Parliamentary Party and behind Sinn Féin.

==== Hulluch, 1916 ====
A German gas attack on 27 April in the Battle of Hulluch caused 385 casualties. The 16th (Irish) Division remained in Loos-en-Gohelle until August. They then moved to The Somme but not before suffering 6,000 casualties, including 1,496 deaths. One major event of this period—the Easter Rising in Dublin, it was concluded by a number of historians, that the Rising had no detrimental impact on Irish troops, even on those with Republican sympathies.

==== Battle of the Somme, 1916 ====
The Battle of the Somme commenced early on 1 July and the day ended with a total of 60,000 allied casualties of whom 20,000 were killed in action. The 36th (Ulster) Division suffered 5,500 casualties and 2,000 of these were killed in action. The 1st Royal Dublin Fusiliers fought next to the 36th and endured 147 casualties – 22 killed and 64 missing in action. The 2nd Royal Dublin Fusiliers lost 14 of their 23 officers 311 out of a total of 480 in other ranks. There was also Irish participation in 1st Royal Irish Rifles, 1st Royal Irish Fusiliers, 1st Royal Inniskilling Fusiliers and 2nd Royal Inniskilling Fusiliers, 2nd Royal Irish Regiment, in four battalions of the Northumberland Fusiliers. The Battle continued until the following November when it was ended as a consequence of inclement weather.

While progress was limited the 16th (Irish) Division captured Guillemont on 2 September and Ginchy on 9 September. A London newspaper headlined How the Irish took Ginchy – Spendid daring of the Irish troops The former Nationalist MP for East Tyrone, lawyer and economics professor at UCD, Tom Kettle was killed at the Somme.

==== Messines Ridge, June 1917 ====
Following the successful engagement of the Dublin Fusiliers during the Arras Offensive in April, the 16th (Irish) and 36th (Ulster) Divisions fought alongside each other to capture the Belgium village of Wijtschate in a well planned attack in June 1917 at the Battle of Messines. It saw the largest ever concentration of Irish soldiers on a battlefield. Their advance across awful county has been reported by all who saw it as a sight never to be forgotten, a captured German officer stated that they moved as if on parade. They took all of their objectives on schedule despite the loss of nearly all of their supporting tanks. The subsequent battle was a complete success militarily, the two divisions showing great fortitude—the Germans were no match for them as they mopped up all resistance, advancing over two miles in a few days with minimal losses, incredible by Western Front standards. One of those lost in the advance on 17 June was 56-year-old Major Willie Redmond MP for East Clare and other constituencies for 34 years. He was a brother of John Redmond, leader of the Irish Parliamentary Party.

==== Passchendaele, July 1917 ====
The following month, July 1917, both Divisions moved under the command of General Sir Hubert Gough, Commander of the British Fifth Army, who had little regard for the Irish, and who ordered an advance to the east of Ypres towards well fortified German positions left untouched by totally inadequate British artillery preparation during the Third Battle of Ypres. By mid-August, the 16th (Irish) had suffered over 4,200 casualties and the 36th (Ulster) had suffered almost 3,600 casualties, or more than 50 percent of their numbers. Fr Willie Doyle a Jesuit and chaplain to the 10th (Irish) Division was killed. He had been awarded the Military Cross and was nominated for the Victoria Cross for his commendable bravery. The poet Francis Ledwidge was killed on 31 July.

==== Spring Offensive, March 1918 ====
The 16th (Irish) Division and the 36th (Ulster) Division were almost completely wiped out due to Gough's insufficient defence preparations for the expected great German spring offensive towards Amiens in March 1918. One third of the total personnel were killed—over 6,400 in the 16th and over 6,100 in the 36th, which also resulted in the April conscription crisis. Irish manpower was reallocated to other Divisions when following the American campaigns they took part in the final Hundred Days Offensive which by October drove the Germans back from territory gained in the previous four years, to end the war.

=== Middle East Fronts ===
==== Gallipoli, 1915 ====
A stalemate on the Western Front prompted an alternative approach to beating Germany by opening a second front in the east for which Russia needed urgent aid from the Mediterranean, to launch an assault to tie down the German army. However, as the Ottoman Empire controlled the Bosporus sea passage, the Royal Navy tried to sail up the Dardanelles in March but several ships were lost. As a result, Irish, British, French, Australian and New Zealand troops were formed into the Mediterranean Expeditionary Force and transported from Britain to Gallipoli for a land invasion.

In the Gallipoli Campaign an invasion was attempted at six locations in April but Turkish defences kept the advance close to the beach. Irish battalions suffered extremely heavy losses during the V beach Landing at Cape Helles which was the most important of the landings and defended by four entrenched Turkish machine gun posts.

The main force was deployed from the SS River Clyde, a 4,000 ton converted collier. The ship held 2,000 men; the 1st Battalion of the Royal Munster Fusiliers plus two companies of the 2nd Battalion, the Hampshire Regiment and one company of the 1st Battalion Royal Dublin Fusiliers. The first approach to V Beach was made by the Royal Dublin Fusiliers in boats that were towed or rowed. The remaining battalions followed. Wave after wave of men were mown down as they attempted to reach shore. Few succeeded, but they never faltered. Their efforts to build a bridgehead were in vain, suffering over 600 Irish casualties in a 36-hour period.

Another attempt was made in August but this too failed. Winston Churchill who had proposed the venture resigned from Government.

==== Serbia, 1915 ====
With the Bulgarian invasion of Serbia, both Greece and Serbia requested Allied help. A force of 2,454 attached to the 10th (Irish) Division sailed from Gallipoli to Salonika on 29 September to fight on the Bulgarian front during the Macedonian campaign. There the Royal Dublin 6th/7th Battalions and Munsters 6th/7th Battalions were deployed to take the village of Jenikoj (present-day Novo Selo?), during which they suffered 385 casualties.

In December, still wearing summer uniforms, the severe snow and frost caused many casualties. The 10th Division, which included Connaught Rangers, together with the Anglo-French forces having failed to prevent the fall of Serbia after the Bulgarian forces made intensive progress, were ordered to retreat. They remained at Salonika, where during 1916 they were built up to strength again.

==== Greece, 1916 ====
The Bulgarians, with German support, crossed the Greek frontier on 26 May 1916. The 10th Division was first sent into action in August along the Struma River valley, coming into action against the Bulgarians on 30 September in the 'Struma offensive', crossing the river and taking the village of Yenikoi (present-day Provatas in Serres Prefecture, Greece) then after a Bulgarian counterattack retaking it, but at the cost of 500 men. Now well below strength, also due to the malaria in summer and lack of recruits, they remained in Provatos. The division withstood further Bulgarian attacks in March 1917. In late summer the 10th was withdrawn to be re-engaged to stem the Turks in Palestine.

==== Palestine, 1917 ====
Embarking from Salonika, they arrived via Egypt in Ismalia on 12. September. October was spent training after a redress, before entering the Sinai and Palestine Campaign. After the Battle of Gaza and the Turkish withdrawal early November, the 10th Division was refitted and returned to the line at the end of November. It encountered considerable sniper fire on the way to the capture of Jerusalem, which was entered unopposed on 9. December. With relatively low losses the division had taken what was asked of it. After so many defeats since Gallipoli, they at last tasted victory. Into 1918 was spent on reconstruction work. Fighting flared up again in March which required an advance towards Nablis. This enemy engagement was to be the last action in Palestine.

==== France, 1918 ====
Heavy losses encountered on the Western Front after the great German spring offensive, resulted in the transfer of 60,000 men from Palestine to France, including ten battalions of the 10th Division. They embarked at Alexandria arriving Marseille on 2 June 1918 and were transferred to the 2RMF for the beginning of the Hundred Days Offensive. For continuation, see 'Spring Offensive, March 1918' above.

== Casualties ==
The number of Irish deaths in the British Army recorded by the registrar general was 27,405, a casualty rate of 14 percent, roughly in line with the rest of the British forces. By contrast, the National War Memorial at Islandbridge, Dublin is dedicated "to the memory of the 49,400 Irish soldiers who gave their lives in the Great War, 1914–1918". This figure appears to be inaccurate however. The figure of 49,400, refers to all the fatalities in the Irish Divisions, whether Irish born or not. In fact, only 71 percent of the casualties in these Divisions were natives of Ireland. A study published in 2017 found 29,450 men who were either born, lived in or had next of kin in the 26 counties that became the Irish Free State killed in the war in British and Commonwealth forces, including the Australian and Canadian armies as well as the British Army. Another study counts the Northern Ireland war deaths (that is of soldiers who were born in the counties would go on to from Northern Ireland) as 10,300, which would put the confirmed all-Ireland death toll at about 40,000.

Around another 1,000 Irish-born men lost their lives serving with the United States Army in the conflict.

The dead were buried close to the battlefield, but some of the seriously injured were sent to convalesce in Ireland. Those who died of their wounds in Ireland were buried in the Grangegorman Military Cemetery, if their bodies were not claimed by their families. The majority of those buried in Grangegorman are from the Great War.

== Demobilisation and post war experience ==
The War ended with the Armistice on 11 November; a war that had the active participation of an estimated 210,000 Irish men and women in the British forces and more in other allied armies.

When the Irish Divisions raised for the war were demobilised, roughly 100,000 war veterans returned to Ireland. This indicates that in the region of 70–80,000 decided to live elsewhere. Several reasons may explain this, one being high unemployment in Ireland and another being the rise of militant nationalism in the country, which in many cases was hostile to those who had served in the British forces.

In 1919 the Irish land act (provision for Sailors and Soldiers) was enacted to provide approximately 5000 houses and state-aided housing welfare for soldiers returning from the war. Most of these houses were constructed in the late 1920s (after the formation of the Irish Free State), and intended to facilitate the reinstatement of ex-servicemen into civilian life.

With the outbreak of the guerrilla conflict, the Irish War of Independence (1919–1921), in which the Irish Republican Army attacked the police and British military, ex-servicemen were in a divisive situation. For veterans who became involved, some like Tom Barry who had served in the British Army in WWI along with Emmet Dalton joined the IRA sometime after Armistice Day. While many joined paramilitary police forces, the Black and Tans and Auxiliary Division, charged with putting down the guerrillas. In County Clare, for example, 15 locals joined the Auxiliaries, all of whom were war veterans, while 46 joined the Black and Tans, of whom 25 had served in the British Army Similarly in Northern Ireland, many ex-servicemen joined the Ulster Special Constabulary – an armed Auxiliary police force raised for counter-insurgency purposes. Over half of this (mostly Protestant and Unionist) force's 32,000 recruits were veterans of the Great War.

British veterans, along with numbers of Irish veterans of WWI who served in the British army joined the Black and Tans after the war, approximately 10% of the Black & Tan's recruits and 14% of the Auxiliaries were Irishmen. with this organisation then going on to perpetrate a number of atrocities during the Irish War of Independence. For these reasons, many nationalists were reluctant for many years to recognise the part that Irishmen had played in the world war on Britain's side.

The majority of ex-servicemen, who took no active part in the conflict, were however in some cases subjected to suspicion and intimidation by the IRA due to, amongst other things, having pledged allegiance to the British Empire as a prerequisite before their participation in the British Army. Some were targeted by the IRA for allegedly giving information to British forces, and for example, a total of 29 ex-servicemen were shot dead in County Cork as suspected informers.> In total out of around 200 civilians killed by the IRA as informers, 82 were ex-servicemen.

When most of Ireland left the United Kingdom on the formation of the Irish Free State in 1922, the five regular, full-time Irish regiments whose recruiting areas were in southern Ireland: the Royal Dublin Fusiliers, the Royal Munster Fusiliers, the Connaught Rangers, the Leinster Regiment and the Royal Irish Regiment, that had suffered so severely in the Great War, were disbanded. While in some cases renamed or amalgamated, the remaining regular Irish regiments continued in service. These comprised the Irish Guards, the 5th Royal Inniskilling Dragoon Guards, the 8th King's Royal Irish Hussars, the Royal Inniskilling Fusiliers, the Royal Ulster Rifles and the Royal Irish Fusiliers.

Thousands of these ex-servicemen re-enlisted in the emerging Free State's newly formed National Army on the pro-Treaty side after the outbreak in June 1922, of the Irish Civil War, during which multiple atrocities were committed. In July 1922 the Dáil authorised raising a force of 35,000 men; by May 1923 this had grown to 58,000. The National Army lacked the expertise necessary to train a force of that size, such that approximately one fifth of its officers and half of its soldiers were Irish ex-servicemen of the British Army and men like Martin Doyle, Emmet Dalton, W. R. E. Murphy, and Henry Kelly brought considerable combat experience to it. W.R.E. Murphy rose to second in command in the Free State's National Army in the civil war and after became Commissioner of the Dublin Metropolitan Police.

== Commemoration ==
=== In the Free State and the Republic of Ireland ===
Due to the complexity of the Irish experience during the Great War, and the hostility of much nationalist thinking to those who had fought in it on the British side, the Irishmen who fought and died in the war were not officially acknowledged for many years. According to historian Michael Hopkinson, "Large elements of Irish society were effectively excluded from Irish politics; Sinn Féin represented only part of the Irish nation. The virtual ban on the commemoration of the Irish dead of the First World War dramatically illustrates this".

From 1919 to 1925, Remembrance Day was marked with a ceremony on College Green in central Dublin. However this service was consistently marked by rioting between nationalists, unionists and ex-servicemen. In 1925, after Irish Independence, it was relocated to the Phoenix Park, outside the city centre, ostensibly for "traffic reasons". The IRA, an illegal group after its defeat in the civil war of 1922–23, sometimes attacked Poppy Appeal sellers and disrupted Remembrance Day events throughout the 1920s and 1930s.

Although the Irish government donated £50,000 in 1927 towards the construction of a Great War Memorial in Dublin, they put it in Islandbridge, outside the city centre, rather than in Merrion Square as originally proposed. Government minister Kevin O'Higgins (whose two brothers had served in the world war) summed up the dilemma of the moderate nationalist Cumann na nGaedheal government,

"I say that any intelligent visitor, not particularly versed in the history of the country, would be entitled to conclude that the origins of this State were connected with...the memorial in that park Merrion Square and the lives lost in the Great War in France, Belgium, Gallipoli and so on. That is not the position. The State has other origins and because it has other origins, I do not wish to see it suggested, in stone or otherwise, that it has that origin".

The Republican opposition of Fianna Fáil was much more hostile,

"Mr Cosgrave's grant of £50,000 out of the Irish people's money for their English Memorial Park, throws off the mask of Irish nationality under which members of the Free State government have hitherto tried to deceive the Irish people"

Although the Memorial Park was opened in 1948, it was not until 2006 that the Irish state held an official commemoration there for the Irish dead of the First World War, when President of Ireland Mary McAleese and the Taoiseach Bertie Ahern, marked the 90th anniversary of the Battle of the Somme on 1 July.

Introduced in 1986, the National Day of Commemoration held each July in the Royal Hospital Kilmainham commemorates "all Irish people who died in past wars or United Nations peacekeeping missions". Charles Lysaght commented "it does less than justice to the Irish who went to the First World War to lump them in with all the Irish who died in the service of other countries".

The unveiling of a Cross of Sacrifice to honour Irish soldiers who died in both world wars, took place at Glasnevin Cemetery, Dublin, on 31 July 2014. It was unveiled by the President of Ireland Michael D. Higgins together with the President of the Commonwealth War Graves Commission, the Duke of Kent, who both laid wreaths. The Minister for Arts, Heritage and the Gaeltacht Heather Humphreys also attended the ceremony, which coincided with the centenary of the outbreak of World War I.

=== In Northern Ireland ===
Northern Ireland, where the War was seen by unionists as a mark of British patriotism, has always officially commemorated the dead of both world wars on Armistice Day. For unionists, their contribution to the First World War, in particular, was a potent symbol of their loyalty to Britain. In the words of Keith Jeffrey, "It marks the Union sealed with blood. It stands for the ultimate test of Ulster's loyalty: a Blood Sacrifice to match any by Irish Nationalists".

For this reason although Northern Catholics had enlisted during the War just as often as Protestants, they were excluded from the War's Commemoration, which became an almost exclusively Unionist event.

Today at the Somme, there is a monument to the 36th (Ulster) Division at Thiepval, but only two little Celtic crosses to commemorate the 16th (Irish) Division.

The 16th (Irish) Division was made up of Irish nationalists and thus was predominantly Catholic, and for the best part of the rest of the 20th century it was almost eliminated from the historiography of the Great War, while at the same time the achievements of the 36th (Ulster) Division became part of the culture of Northern Irish Protestants.

== Memorials ==
Memorials commemorating those Irish who served and died in the Great War:

- Irish National War Memorial Gardens
- Island of Ireland Peace Park Messines, Belgium.
- Menin Gate Memorial Ypres, Belgium.
- Ulster Tower Memorial Thiepval, France.
- Pery Square War Memorial, Limerick

== Infantry and Special Reserve regiments raised in Ireland ==
Original title	Changes	Regular battalions	Militia battalions	Depot	Regimental area	Divisions served
The Connaught Rangers	Disbanded 1922	88th (Connaught Rangers); Regiment of Foot 94th Regiment of Foot	South Mayo Rifles Militia Galway Militia; Roscommon Militia; North Mayo Fusiliers Militia	City of Galway	County Galway, County Leitrim, County Mayo, Co. Roscommon	British Expeditionary Force; 2nd Division (United Kingdom); 10th (Irish) Division; 16th (Irish) Division
The Leinster Regiment	Disbanded 1922	100th (Prince of Wales's Royal Canadian); Regiment of Foot 109th (Bombay Infantry); Regiment of Foot	King's County; Royal Rifles Militia Queen's County; Royal Rifles Militia; Royal Meath Militia	Crinkill, Birr; County Offaly	King's County, County Longford, County Meath, Queen's County, County Westmeath	6th Division (United Kingdom); 10th (Irish) Division; 14th (Light) Division; 16th (Irish) Division; 24th Division (United Kingdom); 27th Division (United Kingdom); 29th Division (United Kingdom); 34th Division (United Kingdom); 66th (East Lancashire) Division
The Royal Dublin Fusiliers	Disbanded 1922	102nd (Royal Madras Fusiliers); Regiment of Foot 103rd (Royal Bombay Fusiliers); Regiment of Foot	Kildare Rifles Militia Queen's Own Royal; Dublin City Militia; Dublin County; Light Infantry Militia	Naas, County Kildare	City of Dublin, County Dublin, County Kildare	British Expeditionary Force; 4th Division (United Kingdom); 10th (Irish) Division; 16th (Irish) Division; 29th Division (United Kingdom); 50th (Northumbrian) Division
The Royal Inniskilling Fusiliers		27th (Inniskilling); Regiment of Foot 108th (Madras Infantry); Regiment of Foot	Fermanagh Light Infantry Militia Royal Tyrone Fusiliers Militia; Londonderry Light Infantry Militia; The Prince of Wales's; Own Donegal Militia	Omagh, County Tyrone	County Donegal (until 1922), County Fermanagh, Co. Londonderry, County Tyrone	16th (Irish) Division; 29th Division (United Kingdom); 30th Division (United Kingdom) 36th (Ulster) Division; 50th (Northumbrian) Division
The Royal Irish Fusiliers		87th (Royal Irish Fusiliers); Regiment of Foot 89th (Princess Victoria's); Regiment of Foot	Armagh Light Infantry Militia Cavan Militia; Monaghan Militia	Armagh, County Armagh	County Armagh plus County Cavan, County Monaghan (until 1922)	10th (Irish) Division; 16th (Irish) Division; 36th (Ulster) Division
Royal Irish Regiment; South Irish Horse	Disbanded 1922	18th (The Royal Irish); Regiment of Foot (2 battalions)	Wexford Militia 2nd or North Tipperary; Light Infantry Militia; Kilkenny Fusiliers Militia	Clonmel, County Tipperary	County Kilkenny, County Tipperary, County Waterford, County Wexford	10th (Irish) Division; 29th Division (United Kingdom)
The Royal Irish Rifles; North Irish Horse	Disbanded 1922 1922: The Royal Ulster Rifles	83rd (County of Dublin); Regiment of Foot 86th (Royal County Down); Regiment of Foot	Royal North Down Rifles Royal Antrim Rifles Militia; Royal South Down; Light Infantry Militia; Royal Louth Rifles Militia	Belfast, County Antrim; County Down	County Antrim, County Down, County Louth (until 1922)	16th (Irish) Division; 36th (Ulster) Division
The Royal Munster Fusiliers	Disbanded 1922	101st (Royal Bengal Fusiliers); Regiment of Foot 104th (Bengal Fusiliers); Regiment of Foot	South Cork Light Infantry Militia Kerry Militia; Royal Limerick County Militia (Fusiliers)	Tralee, County Kerry, Fermoy, County Cork	County Clare, City of Cork, County Cork, County Kerry, County Limerick	British Expeditionary Force; 1st Division; 10th (Irish) Division; 16th (Irish) Division; 29th Division (United Kingdom); 31st Division (United Kingdom); 50th (Northumbrian) Division; 57th (2nd West Lancashire) Division

== See also ==
- Garden of Remembrance (Dublin), to participants in Irish nationalist rebellions
- Irish World War I recipients of the Victoria Cross
- Ireland rugby internationals killed in action in WWI
- Observe the Sons of Ulster Marching Towards the Somme
- Irish neutrality during World War II

== Reading sources ==
- Thomas Bartlett & Keith Jeffery: A Military History of Ireland, Cambridge University Press (1996) (2006), ISBN 0-521-62989-6
- Desmond & Jean Bowen: Heroic Option: The Irish in the British Army, Pen & Sword Books (2005), ISBN 1-84415-152-2
- Bowman, Timothy (2003). Irish Regiments in the Great War. Manchester: Manchester University Press. ISBN 0-7190-6285-3.
- Bowman, Timothy; et al., eds. (2020). The disparity of sacrifice : Irish recruitment to the British armed forces, 1914-1918. Liverpool: Liverpool University Press. ISBN 978-1-78-962185-3.
- Turtle Bunbury: The Glorious Madness, Tales of The Irish and The Great War, Gill & Macmillan, Dublin 12 (2014), ISBN 978 0717 16234 5
- Cooper, Bryan Ricco (1918). The 10th (Irish) Division in Gallipoli. London: H. Jenkins Limited. OCLC 8149667.
- Corrigan, Gordon (2012) [2003]. Mud, Blood & Poppycock. Cassell Military Paperback. Cassell. ISBN 978-0-3043-6659-0.
- Terence Denman: Ireland's unknown Soldiers: the 16th (Irish) Division in the Great War, Irish Academic Press (1992), (2003), ISBN 0-7165-2495-3
- Thomas P. Dooley: Irishmen or English Soldiers? : the Times of a Southern Catholic Irish Man (1876–1916), Liverpool Press (1995), ISBN 0-85323-600-3
- Myles Dungan: They Shall not Grow Old: Irish Soldiers in the Great War, Four Courts Press (1997), ISBN 1-85182-347-6
- David Fitzpatrick: Politics and Irish Life, 1913–1921: Provincial Experience of War and Revolution, Cork University Press (1998 new edition), ISBN 978-1859181744
- Richard Grayson: Belfast Boys: How Unionists and Nationalists Fought and Died Together in the First World War, Continuum (2010), ISBN 978-1441105196
- Hart, Peter (1998). The IRA and its Enemies: Violence and Community in Cork, 1916-1923. Oxford: Oxford University Press. ISBN 978-0-19-820806-8.
- John Horne ed.: Our War 'Ireland and the Great War': The Thomas Davis Lectures, The Royal Irish Academy, Dublin (2008), ISBN 978-1-904890-50-8
- Keith Jeffery: Ireland and the Great War, Press Syndicate of the University of Cambridge (2000), ISBN 0-521-77323-7
- Steven Moore: The Irish on the Somme (2005), ISBN 0-9549715-1-5
- David Murphy: Irish Regiments in the World Wars, Osprey Publishing (2007), ISBN 978-1-84603-015-4
- David Murphy: The Irish Brigades, 1685–2006, A gazetteer of Irish Military Service past and present, Four Courts Press (2007)
  The Military Heritage of Ireland Trust, ISBN 978-1-84682-080-9
- Cormac Ó Comhraí: Ireland and the First World War; A Photographic History, Mercier Press, Cork (2014), ISBN 978 1 78117248 3
- Catriona Pennell: A Kingdom United: Popular Responses to the Outbreak of the First World War in Britain and Ireland, Oxford University Press (2012), ISBN 978-0199590582
- Steel, Nigel; Hart, Peter (2002) [1994]. Defeat at Gallipoli. Pan Macmillan. ISBN 978-0-33-049058-0.
- Stephen Walker: Forgotten Soldiers; The Irishmen shot at dawn Gill & Macmillan, Dublin 12 (2007), ISBN 978-0-7171-4182-1
