= Royal Munster Fusiliers (New Army) =

The Royal Munster Fusiliers was a regular infantry regiment of the British Army. One of eight Irish regiments raised largely in Ireland, its home depot in Tralee. With the outbreak of World War I in August 1914 the immediate need for a considerable expansion of the British Army resulted in the formation of the New Army under Lord Kitchener. The war target was seventy divisions in all, the New Army to have thirty volunteer divisions separate and under Army Order 324, as additional from the Regular Army, with a planned period of service of at least three years. On 7 August a general United Kingdom-wide call for 100,000 volunteers aged 19–30 was issued. The battalions were to be distinguished by the word 'Service' after their number.

The first new battalions were raised as units of Kitchener's new K1 Army Group, which led to the formation of the 6th and 7th (Service) Battalions, Royal Munster Fusiliers (RMF) comprising the 30th Brigade of the 10th (Irish) Division, under the command of General Bryan Mahon.

The 8th and 9th RMF (Service) Battalions followed as units of the 16th (Irish) Division's 47th and 48th Brigades, part of Kitchener's second new K2 Army Group, the 16th Division under the command of Major General William Hickie . In the course of the war heavy losses suffered by the Regular RMF Battalions caused the new service battalions to be disbanded and absorbed in turn by the regular battalions, the last on 2 June 1918 when the 8th (Service) RMF was amalgamated with the 1st (Regular) RMF Battalion.

The Kaiser knows the Munsters, by the Shamrock on their caps, And the famous Bengal Tiger, ever ready for a scrap, And all his big battalions, Prussian guards and grenadiers, Fear to face the flashing bayonets of the Munster Fusiliers.

== 6th, 7th (Service) Battalions ==
=== Curragh ===
Both battalions were formed at Tralee Depot, County Kerry in August 1914 and moved to the Curragh as the 30th Brigade of their division for initial training and receiving recruits from the recruiting districts. An early problem was to find 29 sufficiently experienced officers for the battalions. By the time they transferred to Basingstoke England in May they had a variety of regular, retired and reserve officers designated from other battalions. Both battalions had their ranks further diversified, receiving surplus recruits from other British regiments, such as the Royal Inniskilling Fusiliers to the 6th RMF, Ulster recruits then numbering Munster recruits.

=== Gallipoli ===
After very hard training, both battalions embarked on 9 July 1915 from Liverpool, disembarking on 19 July in Greece at Mudros on the Aegean island of Lemnos. Disease reduced battalion strength from 1000 to 800 even before the planned landing at Suvla Bay on the Gallipoli peninsula. The intention was to land north of the Turkish forces and cut them off, opening the way to Constantinople. The 1st Regular RMF had already been engaged in fighting with varying intensity since its landing in April. The 10th (Irish) Division landed at Suvla Bay on 7 August, already weakened by the fact that a number of its battalions had been landed on the wrong beaches. The tenth division was left with only five battalions, including the two RMFs, out of 13. Their objective was to capture the Kiretch Tepe Sirk ridge along the North side of the bay. The 6th landed first with 25 officers and 749 men, then the 7th with 28 officers and 750 men.

=== Retreat ===
The 6th were raw troops in action for the first time in what was known as the Battle of Sari Bair Ridge. Held up by concealed trenches, lack of water, heat and exhaustion, they lost over 70 killed by dusk when they withdrew. Although they outnumbered the Turks, a further day was lost due to lack of leadership at Corps level, during which the enemy reinforced its position. The RMF attack resumed on 9. August but came to a halt at the bottom of the ridge. A naval bombardment failed its objectives. When scrub caught fire they withdrew and entrenched. Bitter cold nights made them retire to the beaches where 350 reinforcements arrived. On 15 August the 10th Division made its final thrust taking the north slope of the ridge costing the 6th RMF 43 killed, the 7th RMF in support lost 23 killed. The 6th held its position overnight under heavy bombardment, then had to withdraw next day.

The ridge had been nearly captured, but by the 19. both battalions were down to half strength since landing. During the last offensive by the British forces in the Battle of Scimitar Hill on 21. August, the battalions played a supportive role, after which static trench warfare ensued to the end of September. Casualties from sickness now exceeded those from enemy action. The 10th (Irish) Division was withdrawn and embarked for Mudras on the 30., the 7th RMF with only 6 officers and 305 men, the 6th RMF with fewer than 450 men.

=== Serbia ===
With the Bulgarian invasion of Serbia, both Greece and Serbia requested Allied help. In response the 10th (Irish) Division was shipped to Salonika for the Macedonian campaign. The division received extensive training as well as reinforcements from non-regimental sources changing the character of the two battalions. Still wearing summer uniforms the severe snow and frost at high level caused many casualties. The Bulgarian forces made intensive progress and threatened the Anglo-French force, the 7th RMF in a front line position. At Kosturino it held the rearguard as the 10th Division, which included Connaught Rangers and Royal Dublin Fusiliers, was ordered to retreat at the end of December. Having failed to prevent the fall of Serbia, the Allied forces remained at Salonika, where during early 1916 the two RMF battalions were built up to strength again.

=== Greece ===
The Bulgarians, with German support, crossed the Greek frontier on 26 May. The 10th Division was first sent into action in August along the Struma River valley, coming into action against the Bulgarians on 30 September in the 'Struma offensive', crossing the river and taking the village of Yenikoi (present-day Provatas in Serres Prefecture, Greece), then reoccupying it again after a Bulgarian counterattack, but at the cost of 500 men. Both RMF battalions crossed back on 15 October for a rest period. Now well below strength due to the malaria in summer and lack of recruits, it resulted in the amalgamation, on 3 November, of the 7th into the 6th RMF after they returned again to Yeninkoi. . The division withstood further Bulgarian attacks in March 1917. In late summer the 10th was withdrawn to be deployed to stem the Turks on the Palestine front.

=== Palestine ===
They embarked from Salonika on the 9. September 1917, arriving via Egypt in Ismalia on 12. September, October spent training after redress, entering the Sinai and Palestine Campaign. During the Battle of Gaza from the 27. October the 6th RMF were not greatly involved to their disappointment, the Turks withdrawing by 7 November. Following a refit the 10th Division returned to the line 25. November, the 6th RMF encountering considerable sniper fire on the way to the capture of Jerusalem, which was entered unopposed on 9. December. With relatively low losses the 6th RMF had taken what was asked of it. After so many defeats since Gallipoli, they were at last tasting victory. . Into 1918 was spent on reconstruction work, when fighting flared up again in March requiring an advance towards Nablus. This enemy engagement was to be the last action in Palestine.

=== France ===
Heavy losses had been encountered on the Western Front after the great German March offensive, resulting in the transfer of 60,000 men from Palestine to France, their place taken by Indian battalions. Ten battalions of the 10th (Irish) Division were included, the 6th RMF one of them. 35 officers and 812 other ranks embarked at Alexandria arriving Marseille on 2 June. It was entrained for the journey northward, reaching Arques on 6 June, marching from there to the camp of the remaining 2nd Regular RMF which had suffered heavily in March and was at cadre level. The 2nd RMF was largely reconstructed with disbanded personnel of the 6th RMF.

The remaining 6th RMF self at cadre strength, was assigned to instruct an American infantry brigade. After completion, they re-joined the 2nd RMF in Dieppe which was in reality the rebuilt 6th RMF. These had been a closely knit unit with relatively low losses since Gallipoli but were soon to suffer heavily in fierce combat during the Hundred Days Offensive and the final weeks before the Armistice in November 1918.

== 8th, 9th (Service) Battalions ==
An Army Order 352 of 11 September 1914 authorised the formation of a second six divisions to be called the K2 Army Group of Kitchener's New Army, and included the 8th and 9th Munsters as battalions of the 16th (Irish) Division's thirteen battalions. The 16th Division officers were all former Regulars. This caused much controversy because experienced officers had previously been drafted to the 10th (Irish) Division and the fact that the 16th (Irish) Division in contrast to the 10th, was to be solely for recruits enlisting in Ireland. Other rebuffs were the rejection by the War Office of distinctive regimental colours and shamrock cap badges. This very much hampered recruitment to the Division.

=== 8th (Service) Battalion ===
This battalion was formed at Fermoy, in October 1914 and reserved for recruits from the Irish National Volunteers by order of the Secretary of State for War, as the 47th Brigade of the 16th (Irish) Division. It also comprised the largest number of recruits from the County Limerick area. It moved to Mitchelstown in November 1914 where it was visited by the Belfast Nationalist M.P. Joseph Devlin. After a stay in Templemore from February 1915, it returned to Fermoy again in May 1915. Then in August it crossed over to Blackdown camp Aldershot, Hampshire, England, undergoing harder training.

=== France ===
Sailing from Southampton the 8th RMF landed in France with the 16th (Irish) Division under its new commander Major-General William Hickie on 19 December 1915 with 33 officers and 948 other ranks, going straight to the Winter trenches on the Loos salient, the front line of the earlier lost Battle of Loos, alongside the 15th (Scottish) Division. Casualties occurred throughout January. During February it was stationed at Béthune for training, returning to the lines, rotating with the 9th RMF through April. In May its casualties were replenished by 12 officers and 200 men from the disbanded 9th Battalion. During June and July it took part on several raids along the Loos sector with its brigade, suffering significant losses, often the battalion's best soldiers. It left with the 16th Division for the Somme sector on 30 August 1916.

=== Ginchy ===
Its area of operation was to the front at Guillemont and Ginchy. It was part of the assault which took Guillemont on 3 September 1916 along with the Connaught Rangers. After the initial attack on Ginchy failed, it was left open to a counter-attack, then withdrawn to recover from its losses. It returned on 7 September 1916 with 200 men for the next attack on Ginchy. With inadequate cover, by 9 September 1916 it was inflicted with heavy casualties and was unable to bury its dead. The other battalions of the 16th (Irish) Division captured Ginchy. The Division was then transferred northwards to the Ypres salient. The 8th RMF was on rotating trench engagements with continual casualties up to 7 November 1916. It was disbanded with 21 officers and 446 other ranks on 22 November 1916, and its personnel drafted into the 1st RMF (Regular) Battalion which had returned from Gallipoli, just three weeks after the disbandment of the 7th RMF in Macedonia.

=== 9th (Service) Battalion ===
The battalion was raised mostly in County Cork between late autumn 1914 and the spring of 1915, having the highest proportion of soldiers from the regimental county. The Independent Nationalist MP. for mid-Cork, Capt. D. D. Sheehan, played a considerable role as officer in its recruitment. After initial training at Kilworth near Buttevant it was stationed at Mallow then moved to Fermoy in June 1915, before crossing to Blackdown camp, Aldershot.

=== France ===
Landing in France on 29 December, it joined the 8th Battalion on the Loos Salient near Aire, described as 'hideous territory', suffering first casualties of its short history in January. Terrific artillery harassment followed right through March. Constant enemy activity, vile weather and appalling trench conditions greatly fatigued the battalion. Heavy losses were caused by mines and trench mortars. It endured a chlorine gas attack at the Battle of Hulluch in April. All enemy assaults were however repelled. The 9th spent its last tour of the trenches as a unit from 6–25 May. The manpower shortages in other RMF regiments necessitated the battalion's disbandment on 30 May. Being the last raised new battalion its personnel were drafted to the 1st, 2nd and 8th RMF Battalions.

== 10th (Service) Battalion ==
This was unusual in many respects. The initiative did not originate with the British Army, but from the West Clare M.P. Arthur Lynch whose intention was to raise a unit in 1918 which did not have the barriers against national identity which had affected the raising of the 16th Division. He had previously raised the Second Irish Brigade to fight for the Boers in the South African War, for which he had been sentenced to death by the British, which was later commuted. He then became involved in constitutional politics.

He campaigned to raise recruits separately from the British recruiting drive in Ireland, which caused much aggravation, putting many obstacles in his way, including having those he recruited diverted elsewhere and the familiar denial of concessions to Irish national sentiments. He only managed to get a special uniform approved for his six pipers, they were to be kilted, their hat badges with the design of an Irish Wolfhound rather than the traditional Munster's emblem of a Bengal tiger.

The battalion was initiated on 18 September 1918 at Ballyvonare Camp, Buttevant, County Cork. It was to be officered only by men with front line experience. Col. Lynch had enlisted 29 men by 5 October and 77 by the middle of the month. He then visited the front in France, calling his unit "my nominal regiment", which made the battalions connection with the RMF tenuous, many of the RMF's prominent officers not knowing the RMF had a 10th battalion. Its numbers were never high, a recruit enlisting on 4 December was the 146th. The unit was not on active service, the Armistice removing any justification for its existence. It was disbanded 14 March 1919, Col. Lynch resigning his commission in April.

== RMF (Regular) Battalions ==
History of 1st and 2nd (Regular) Battalions related under

- Royal Munster Fusiliers

== Reserve and Garrison Battalions ==
History of 3rd (Reserve), 4th and 5th (Extra Reserve) Battalions
History of 1st and 2nd (Garrison) Battalions related under

- Royal Munster Fusiliers (Reserves)

== Great War Memorials ==
- National War Memorial, Islandbridge Dublin.
- Island of Ireland Peace Park Messines, Belgium.
- Menin Gate Memorial Ypres, Belgium.

== Reading references ==
- Martin Staunton: The Royal Munster Fusiliers (1914-1919)
  MA thesis UCD (1986).
- Thomas P. Dooley: Irishmen or English Soldiers ?
  The Times and World of a Southern Catholic Irish Man (1876-1916) enlisting
  in the 9th Battalion Royal Munster Fusiliers, during the First World War
  Liverpool Press (1995), ISBN 0-85323-600-3.
- Bryan Cooper (1918): The 10th (Irish) Division in Gallipoli
  Irish Academic Press (1993), (2003), ISBN 978-0-7165-2517-2.
- Terence Denman: Ireland's unknown Soldiers
  The 16th (Irish) Division in the Great War, 1914-1918
  Irish Academic Press (1992), (2003), ISBN 978-0-7165-2495-3.
- Desmond & Jean Bowen: Heroic Option: The Irish in the British Army
  Pen & Sword Books (2005), ISBN 978-1-84415-152-3.
- Steven Moore: The Irish on the Somme (2005), ISBN 978-0-9549715-1-9.
- Peter Hart: The Somme Weidenfeld & Nicolson (2005), ISBN 0-297-84705-8.
- White, Gerry and O’Shea, Brendan: A Great Sacrifice Cork Servicemen who died in the Great War
  Echo Publications (Cork) (2010), ISBN 978-0-9562443-1-4
