= Battle of Kosturino =

1915 battle in the Balkans Theatre of WWI

Coordinates: 41.3572°N 22.6094°E

- Part of Balkans Theatre of World War I
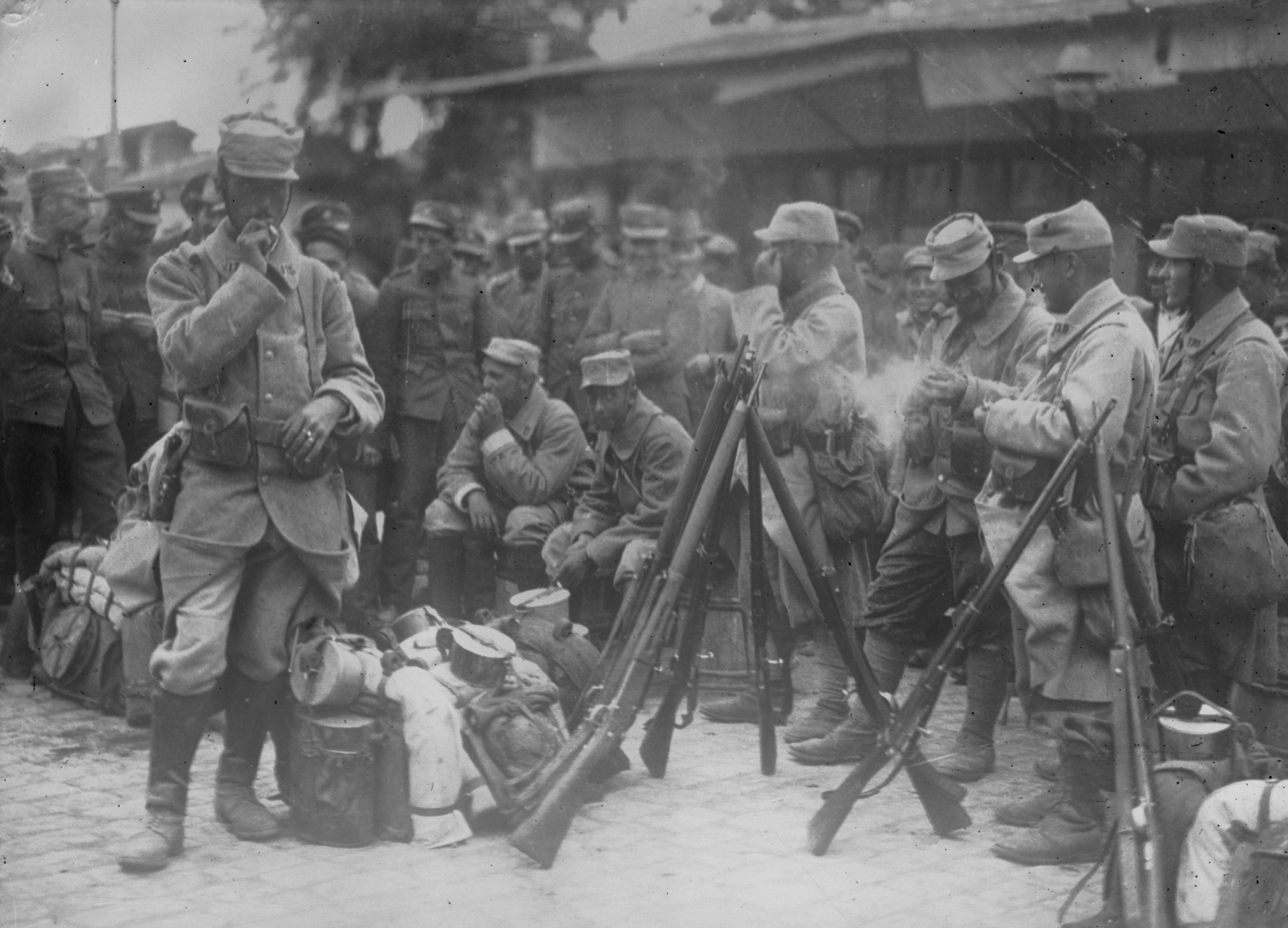
- French soldiers resting in Thessaloniki, 1915
| Date | 6–12 December 1915 |
| Location | Kosturino, Kingdom of Serbia (present-day North Macedonia) |
| Result | Bulgarian victory |

Belligerents
| Bulgaria | United Kingdom; France |

Commanders and leaders
| (Tsardom of Bulgaria (1908–1946)) Georgi Todorov | (United Kingdom of Great Britain and Ireland) Bryan Mahon; (French Third Republic) Maurice Sarrail; (French Third Republic) Maurice Bailloud |

Units involved
| 2nd Army: 11th Bulgarian Division | (United Kingdom of Great Britain and Ireland) 10th Division; (French Third Republic) 156th Division |

Strength
| 1 army | 2 divisions |

Casualties and losses
| 400+ killed | (United Kingdom of Great Britain and Ireland) 99 killed; 386 wounded; 724 missing; 10 guns lost; (French Third Republic) 1,804 casualties; 12 machine guns lost; 36 ammunition wagons lost |

The Battle of Kosturino was a World War I battle fought between 6 and 12 December 1915. It was fought in the initial stage of the Macedonian campaign, in the Balkans Theatre. On 6 December, Bulgarian troops attacked the French and British-held trenches in Kosturino, at the time part of the Kingdom of Serbia (present-day North Macedonia). Though the early offensive was held in check, on 8 December, Bulgaria managed to infiltrate the Memesli ravine. Bulgaria then seized Crete Simonet, thus threatening to outflank the Allies. The Entente defeat at Kosturino led to the complete withdrawal of Allied forces from Serbia, thus enabling the Central Powers to build the Berlin to Constantinople rail line. In the meantime, the Allies concentrated on solidifying their defenses in Greece.

== Prelude ==
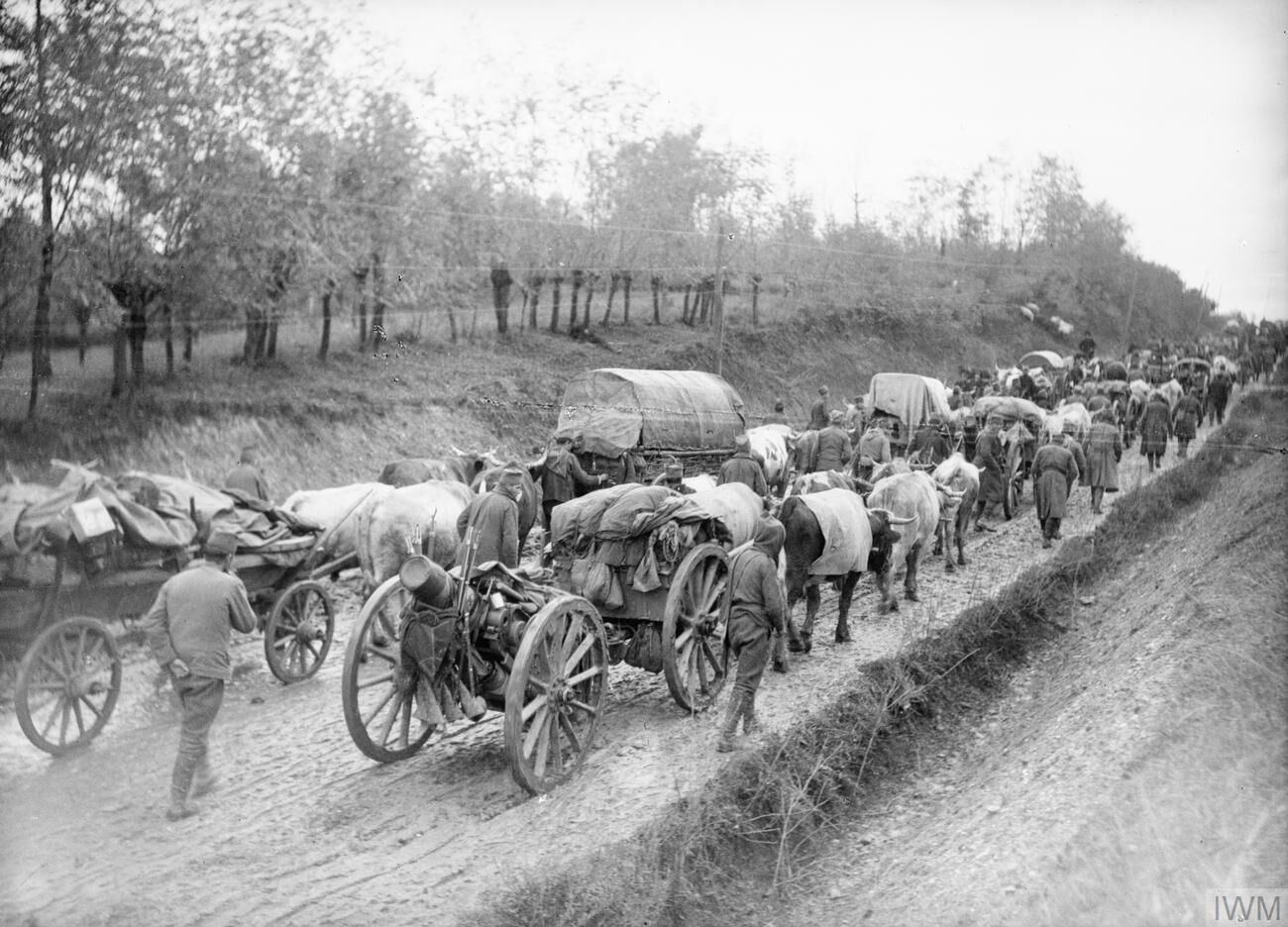
The retreat of the Serbian army at the end of October 1915.

The 28 June 1914, assassination of Austro-Hungarian heir presumptive Archduke Franz Ferdinand precipitated Austria-Hungary's declaration of war against Serbia. The conflict quickly attracted the involvement of all major European countries, pitting the Central Powers against the Entente coalition and starting World War I. After the entry of the Ottoman Empire into the war on the side of the Central Powers (November 1914), the decisive factor in the Balkans became the attitude of Bulgaria. Bulgaria occupied a strategically important position on the Serbian flank, and its intervention on either side of the belligerents would be decisive. Bulgaria and Serbia had fought each other twice in the previous thirty years: in the Serbo-Bulgarian War of 1885 and the Second Balkan War of 1913. Bulgaria had suffered defeat in 1913, and the Bulgarian government and people generally felt that Serbia had stolen land which rightfully belonged to Bulgaria. While the Allies could only offer Bulgaria small territorial concessions from Serbia and neutral Greece, the Central Powers' promises appeared far more enticing, offering to cede most of the land, which Bulgaria claimed. With the Allied defeats at the Battle of Gallipoli (April 1915 to January 1916) and the Russian defeat at Gorlice-Tarnów (May to September 1915) demonstrating the Central Powers' strength, King Ferdinand signed a treaty with Germany and on 21 September 1915 Bulgaria began mobilizing for war.

After the victory of the Serbian army in the Battle of Kolubara in December 1914, the Serbian front saw a lull until the early autumn of 1915. Under the command of Field Marshal August von Mackensen, the Austro-Hungarian Balkan Army, the German 11th Army and river flotillas on the Danube and the Sava began an offensive on 6 October 1915, the largest offensive against Serbia. By September 1915, despite the extreme sacrifice of the Serbian army, the Austro-Hungarian Balkan Army, having crossed the rivers Sava and Drina and the German 11th Army after crossing the Danube, occupied Belgrade, Smederevo, Požarevac and Golubac, creating a vast bridgehead south of the Sava and Danube rivers, and forcing Serbian forces to withdraw to southern Serbia. On 15 October 1915, two Bulgarian armies attacked, overrunning Serbian units, penetrating the valley of the South Morava river near Vranje up to 22 October 1915. The Bulgarian forces occupied Kumanovo, Štip, and Skopje and prevented the withdrawal of the Serbian army to the Greek border and Salonika.

The Allies had repeatedly promised to send military forces to Serbia, but nothing had materialized for a year. But with Bulgaria's mobilization to its south, the situation for Serbia became desperate. Though the developments finally forced the French and the British to send a small expedition force of two divisions to help Serbia, even these arrived too late in the Greek port of Salonika to impact the operations. The main reason for the delay was the lack of available Allied forces due to the critical situation in the Western Front. The Entente used Greek neutrality as an excuse, although they could have used the Albanian coast to rapidly deploy reinforcements and equipment during the first 14 months of the war. (As the Serbian Marshal Putnik had suggested, the Montenegrin army gave adequate cover to the Albanian coast from the north—at a safe distance from any Bulgarian advance in the south in the event of a Bulgarian intervention.) The Entente was also delayed due to protracted secret negotiations to bring Bulgaria into the Allied camp, which would have alleviated Serbia's need for Franco-British help.

In the event, the lack of Allied support sealed the fate of the Serbian Army. Against Serbia, the Central Powers marshalled the Bulgarian Army, a German Army, and an Austro-Hungarian Army, all under the command of Field Marshal Mackensen. The Germans and Austro-Hungarians began their attack on 7 October with a massive artillery barrage, followed by attacks across the rivers. Then, on the 11th, the Bulgarian Army attacked from two directions, one from the north of Bulgaria towards Niš, the other from the south towards Skopje. The Bulgarian Army rapidly broke through the weaker Serbian forces, which tried to block its advance. With the Bulgarian breakthrough, the Serbian position became hopeless; their main army in the north faced either encirclement and enforced surrender or retreat.

Marshal Putnik ordered a full Serbian retreat, southwards and westwards through Montenegro and into Albania. The Serbs faced great difficulties: terrible weather, poor roads and the need for the army to help the tens of thousands of civilians who retreated with them. Only c. 125,000 Serbian soldiers reached the Adriatic coast and embarked on Italian transport ships that carried the army to Corfu and other Greek islands before it travelled on to Thessaloniki. Marshal Putnik had to be carried around during the entire retreat, dying just over a year later in a French hospital.

The French and British divisions marched north from Thessaloniki in October 1915 under the joint command of French General Maurice Sarrail and British General Bryan Mahon. On 20 October, the French divisions reached Krivolak on the Vardar river, while the British occupied the strategically important area between the Kosturino Pass, Vardar and lake Doiran. This advance aided the retreating Serbian army, as the Bulgarians had to concentrate larger forces on their southern flank to deal with a possible invasion of their territory. The French command then became aware of the Bulgarian presence in the Babuna Pass between Veles and Bitola and attempted to reach a group of Serbian soldiers located northwest of the pass. This led to the Battle of Krivolak, which lasted between 5 and 19 November 1915. The French slowed down the Bulgarian advance, thus enabling the bulk of the Serbians to escape; however, Bulgaria retained the dominant mount Arkhangel west of Gradsko, forcing Sarrail to initiate a retreat towards Thessaloniki.

The British forces had, in the meantime, only encountered small bands of Bulgarian deserters, who informed them that the Second Bulgarian Army under General Georgi Todorov had been reinforced at Strumica. On 26 November 1915, a combination of high wind, rain and snow rendered the already steep terrain impassable. The downpour continued until 3 December, soaking the soldiers to the skin and destroying their greatcoats. A total of 23 officers and 1,663 soldiers had to be evacuated back to Salonika due to frostbite and exhaustion, depleting the 10th Irish Division. The division's efficiency was further lowered since most of its soldiers recently arrived, and unassimilated drafts were pulled together from various parts of the British army. On the same day, the French forces that were previously in touch with the British at the Kajali ravine began their evacuation, dangerously exposing the left flank of the 10th Irish Division. Expecting Greece to remain inert, Bulgaria was now able to launch a fresh offensive with its 120 battalions against the 50 that the Allies had at their disposal. On the morning of 4 December, the Bulgarians built trestle bridges across the Crna river, rapidly occupying Bitola.

== Battle ==
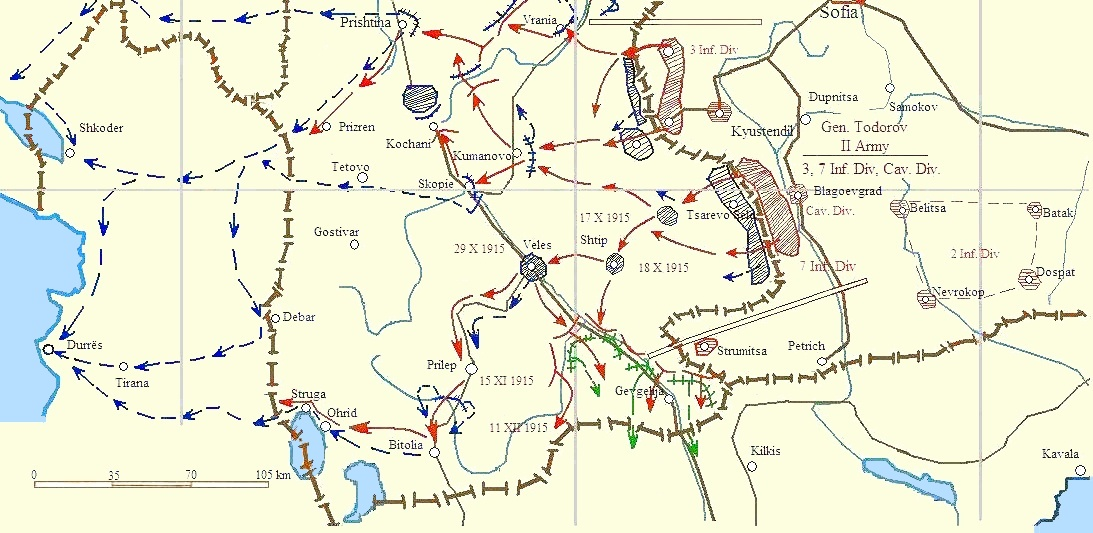
The operations of the Second Bulgarian Army in 1915.

On 4 December 1915, Bulgaria commenced an artillery barrage on British positions along the Kosturino ridge. The artillery preparation continued until 6 December, when it was augmented. The bombardment reached its peak at 2:30 p.m., while concentrating on the Rocky Peak position south of Ormanli, which was held by the Connaught Rangers. Half an hour later, small bands of Bulgarian troops attempted to make their way down the ridge in front of the British trench before being stopped at 60 yards (55 m) from the wire. The Bulgarians briefly overran Rocky Peak before the Royal Irish Fusiliers drove them back in hand-to-hand fighting. At dusk, the Rocky Peak was reinforced by half a company and a single machine gun. The 6th Royal Dublin Fusiliers were transferred to Kajali, with three more companies heading towards Hasanli.

Before the dawn of 7 December, the Bulgarians utilized the heavy fog that covered the battlefield, sneaking up to Rocky Peak and engaging their adversaries with bayonets. Unable to distinguish the similar uniforms, the defenders fought their way back the slope. A machine gun was quickly brought up upon the peak, targeting the 30th British Brigade to the southeast with the support of mountain artillery. Between 9 and 10:00 a.m., the Connaught Rangers repulsed an infantry charge on their position, and a parallel attack on the French portion of the front was also held in check. At 2:00 p.m., four Hampshire companies fell back to Crete Simonet after coming under enfilade fire. A follow-up assault on the Connaught Rangers dislodged them from their trenches and forced them to rally up in Dedeli along with the Hampshires. To the left, the Royal Munster Fusiliers held their ground. However, upon receiving news of the Connaught Rangers' retreat also retired to Dedeli. The 31st British Brigade abandoned Prsten for high ground in Tatarli. Upon General Mahon's request, the 65th British Brigade was dispatched to Dojran. French General Maurice Bailloud also provided a mountain battery and two battalions sent to Tatarli. At the same time, the French rear guard was engaged in skirmishes on both banks of the Vardar River while retreating towards Furka.

On the morning of 8 December, French mountain artillery broke up a Bulgarian attack on the junction between the 156th French Division and the British positions. At 11:00 a.m., Bulgaria resumed its assault on Crete Rivet ahead of Crete Simonet, where two subsequent attacks were fended off. However, the three companies holding the position had to withdraw after losing 64 men. At 3:30 p.m., the British command received a report indicating that Bulgarian troops had infiltrated the Memesli ravine in an attempt to strike the right flank of the 31st British Brigade, while also seeping through between the 5th and 6th Royal Inniskilling Fusiliers in the center. The 31st and 30th British Brigades were immediately ordered to fall back to Causli and Dedeli, respectively. At 5:45 p.m., the Bulgarian army overtook Crete Simonet seizing ten artillery pieces and celebrating their victory by blowing bugles and launching flares. At 2:00 a.m. on 9 December, the 156th French Division plodded to Bajimia after repulsing a Bulgarian attack that left 400 Bulgarians dead no fighting took place during the rest of the day. On 10 December, minor clashes continued as Bulgarian raiding parties harassed the retreating Allies.

At 1:00 p.m. on 11 December, the 11th Bulgarian division seized Bogdanci, cutting the local telephone line and capturing an ammunition depot. The Allies had now selected the Doiran train station as their new target in preparation for a complete evacuation toward Salonika. However, the 9th King's Own Royal Regiment remained isolated from the rest of the Allies, only beginning its withdrawal at 12:45 a.m. on 12 December. An hour later, the regiment encountered a battalion of soldiers resting by the roadside, belatedly realizing they belonged to the enemy. The resulting bayonet charge led to the death or capture of 122 British soldiers. By the evening of the same day, the evacuation of the Entente troops into Greece had been complete, with the 10th British and the 57th, 122nd and 156th French Divisions crossing the border. Greek border guards assured the Allies they would oppose any Bulgarian attempt to cross the frontier. An Allied spy later confirmed that Bulgaria had no intention of breaching the border, halting 2 kilometres (1.2 mi) from it instead.

The battle at Kosturino and the subsequent evacuation of the Allies resulted in 1,209 British casualties, including 99 killed, 386 wounded, 724 missing and ten artillery pieces. French casualties amounted to 1,804 killed, wounded or missing, along with 12 machine guns and 36 ammunition wagons. The number of Bulgarian losses during the battle is estimated to be much greater than that of the Allies, with at least 400 killed on 9 December.

== Aftermath ==
This resulted in a clear, albeit incomplete, victory for the Central Powers. This resulted in them opening the railway line from Berlin to Constantinople, allowing Germany to prop up its weaker partner, the Ottoman Empire. Despite the Central Powers' victory, the Allies managed to save a part of the Serbian army, which, although battered, seriously reduced and almost unarmed, escaped destruction and, after reorganizing, resumed operations six months later. And most damagingly for the Central Powers, the Allies (using the moral excuse of saving the Serbian army) managed to replace the impossible Serbian front with a viable one established in Macedonia (albeit by violating the territory of an officially neutral country), which would prove key to their final victory three years later. The Allies were able to concentrate on fortifying the so-called Entrenched Camp in preparation for a large-scale Bulgarian invasion of Greece and an impending assault on Salonika.

Following the failure of the August Offensive, the Gallipoli Campaign drifted. Ottoman success began to affect public opinion in the United Kingdom, with news discrediting Ian Standish Monteith Hamilton's performance being smuggled out by journalists like Keith Murdoch and Ellis Ashmead-Bartlett. Disaffected senior officers such as General Stopford also contributed to the overall air of gloom. The prospect of evacuation was raised on 11 October 1915, but Hamilton resisted the suggestion, fearing damage to British prestige. He was dismissed as commander shortly afterwards and replaced by Lieutenant General Sir Charles Monro. Autumn and winter brought relief from the heat but also led to gales, blizzards and flooding, resulting in men drowning and freezing to death, while thousands suffered frostbite. After consulting with the commanders of VIII Corps at Helles, IX Corps at Suvla, and Anzac, Sir Herbert Kitchener agreed with Monro and passed his recommendation to the British Cabinet, who confirmed the decision to evacuate in early December. Suvla and Anzac were to be evacuated in late December, the last troops leaving before dawn on 20 December 1915. Troop numbers had been slowly reduced since 7 December 1915, and ruses, such as William Scurry's self-firing rifle, which had been rigged to fire by water dripped into a pan attached to the trigger, were used to disguise the Allied departure. At Anzac Cove, troops maintained silence for around an hour until curious Ottoman troops ventured to inspect the trenches, where the Anzacs opened fire. The final British troops departed from Lancashire Landing around 04:00 on 8 January 1916. The Newfoundland Regiment was chosen to be a part of the rearguard, finally withdrawing from Gallipoli on 9 January 1916.

== See also ==
- Kingdom of Yugoslavia

== Sources ==
- Albertini, Luigi (1953). Origins of the War of 1914. Vol. II. Oxford: Oxford University Press. OCLC 168712.
- Bernede, Alain (1998). "The Gardeners of Salonika: The Lines of Communication and the Logistics of the French Army of the East, October 1915–November 1918". War & Society. 16 (1): 43–59. doi:10.1179/072924798791201129.
- Broadbent, Harvey (2005). Gallipoli: The Fatal Shore. Camberwell, Victoria: Viking/Penguin. ISBN 978-0-670-04085-8.
- Carlyon, Les (2001). Gallipoli. Sydney: Pan Macmillan. ISBN 978-0-7329-1089-1.
- DiNardo, Richard L. (2015). Invasion: The Conquest of Serbia, 1915. Santa Barbara: Praeger. ISBN 9781440800924.
- Falls, C. (1996) [1933]. Military Operations Macedonia: From the Outbreak of War to the Spring of 1917. History of the Great War Based on Official Documents by Direction of the Historical Section of the Committee of Imperial Defence. Vol. I (Imperial War Museum and Battery Press ed.). London: HMSO. ISBN 978-0-89839-242-5.
- Fischer, Fritz (1967). Germany's Aims in the First World War. New York: W.W. Norton. ISBN 978-0-393-09798-6.
- Gordon-Smith, Gordon (1920). From Serbia to Yugoslavia Serbia's Victories, Reverses and Final Triumph, 1914–1918. New York: G.P. Putnam's Sons. ISBN 978-5519466608.
- Nicholson, Gerald W. L. (2007). The Fighting Newfoundlander. Carleton Library Series. Vol. 209. McGill-Queen's University Press. ISBN 978-0-7735-3206-9.
- Korsun, Nikolay (1939). Балканский фронт мировой войны 1914–1918 гг [Balkan Front of the World War 1914–1918] (in Russian). Moscow: Boenizdat. OCLC 7970969.
- Travers, Tim (2001). Gallipoli 1915. Stroud: Tempus. ISBN 978-0-7524-2551-1.
- Villari, Luigi (1922). The Macedonian Campaign. London: T. Fisher Unwin. OCLC 6388448.
- Wahlert, Glenn (2008). Exploring Gallipoli: An Australian Army Battlefield Guide. Australian Army Campaign Series. Vol. 4. Canberra: Army History Unit. ISBN 978-0-9804753-5-7.
- Willmott, H.P. (2003). World War I. New York: Dorling Kindersley. ISBN 978-0-7894-9627-0. OCLC 52541937.
