= Kapetan Mitrousi =

Kapetan Mitrousi Καπετάν Μητρούσι
- Municipal unit
- Location within the regional unit

- Location within Greece
- Coordinates: 41°04′N 23°24′E
- Country: Greece
- Administrative region: Central Macedonia
- Regional unit: Serres
- Municipality: Serres

Area
  - Municipal unit: 87.485 km^{2} (33.778 sq mi)

Population (2021)
  - Municipal unit: 4,125
  - Municipal unit density: 47.15/km^{2} (122.1/sq mi)
- Time zone: UTC+2 (EET)
  - Summer (DST): UTC+3 (EEST)
- Vehicle registration: ΕΡ

Kapetan Mitrousi (Greek: Καπετάν Μητρούσι) is a former municipality in the Serres regional unit, Greece. Since the 2011 local government reform it is part of the municipality Serres, of which it is a municipal unit. It is located in the west-central part of the Serres regional unit and has a population of 4,125 inhabitants (2021 census) and a land area of 87.485 km². The seat of the municipality was the town of Provatas (pop. 829). Its other communities are Mitroúsi (pop. 1,599), Anagénnisis (523), Áno Kamíla (546), Vamvakiá (395) and Monokklisia (233).
