= Monokklisia =

Monokklisia Μονοκκλησιά
- Community
- Location within Greece
- Coordinates: 41°04′N 23°24′E
- Country: Greece
- Administrative region: Central Macedonia
- Regional unit: Serres
- Municipality: Serres
- Municipal unit: Kapetan Mitrousi

Population (2021)
  - Community: 233
- Time zone: UTC+2 (EET)
  - Summer (DST): UTC+3 (EEST)

Monokklisia (Greek: Μονοκκλησιά) is a village in Kapetan Mitrousi, Serres regional unit, northern Greece. In Monokklisia gender equality has been achieved due to the special ancient custom of gynecocracy (γυναικοκρατία), that takes place every year on January 8.
