= 30th Brigade (United Kingdom) =

Military unit

The 30th Brigade was a formation of the British Army during the First World War. It was assigned to the 10th (Irish) Division and served at Gallipoli in the Middle East and Salonika.

== Formation ==
- 6th Battalion, Royal Munster Fusiliers (August 1914 – April 1918, reduced to cadre and transferred to 39th Division)
- 7th Battalion, Royal Munster Fusiliers (August 1914 – November 1916, absorbed by 6th Battalion)
- 6th Battalion, Royal Dublin Fusiliers (August 1914 – May 1918, transferred to 66th Division)
- 7th Battalion, Royal Dublin Fusiliers (August 1914 – April 1918, reduced to cadre and transferred to 16th Division)
- 1st Battalion, Royal Irish Regiment (November 1916 – October 1918)
- 38th Dogras (April – October 1918)
- 46th Punjabis (May – October 1918)
- 1st Battalion, Kashmir Rifles (April – October 1918)
