= 10th (Irish) Division =

10th (Irish) Division 10th Division
- 10th (Irish) Division insignia
- Active: August 1914 – January 1919
- Country: United Kingdom of Great Britain and Ireland
- Branch: British Army
- Type: Infantry
- Size: Division
- Part of: K1 Army Group
- Engagements: World War I Gallipoli campaign Battle of Sari Bair Battle of Chunuk Bair Salonika front Battle of Kosturino Palestine 1917–18 Third Battle of Gaza Battle of Nablus

Commanders
- Notable commanders: Sir Bryan Mahon

The 10th (Irish) Division, was one of the first of Kitchener's New Army K1 Army Group divisions (formed from Kitchener's 'first hundred thousand' new volunteers), authorized on 21 August 1914, after the outbreak of the Great War. It included battalions from the various provinces of Ireland. It was initially led by the Irish Lieutenant General Sir Bryan Mahon and fought at Gallipoli in 1915, Salonika, from 1915–1917, and Palestine from 1917–1918. It was the first of the Irish divisions to take to the field and was the most travelled of the Irish formations. The division served as a formation of the United Kingdom's British Army during World War I.

== History ==
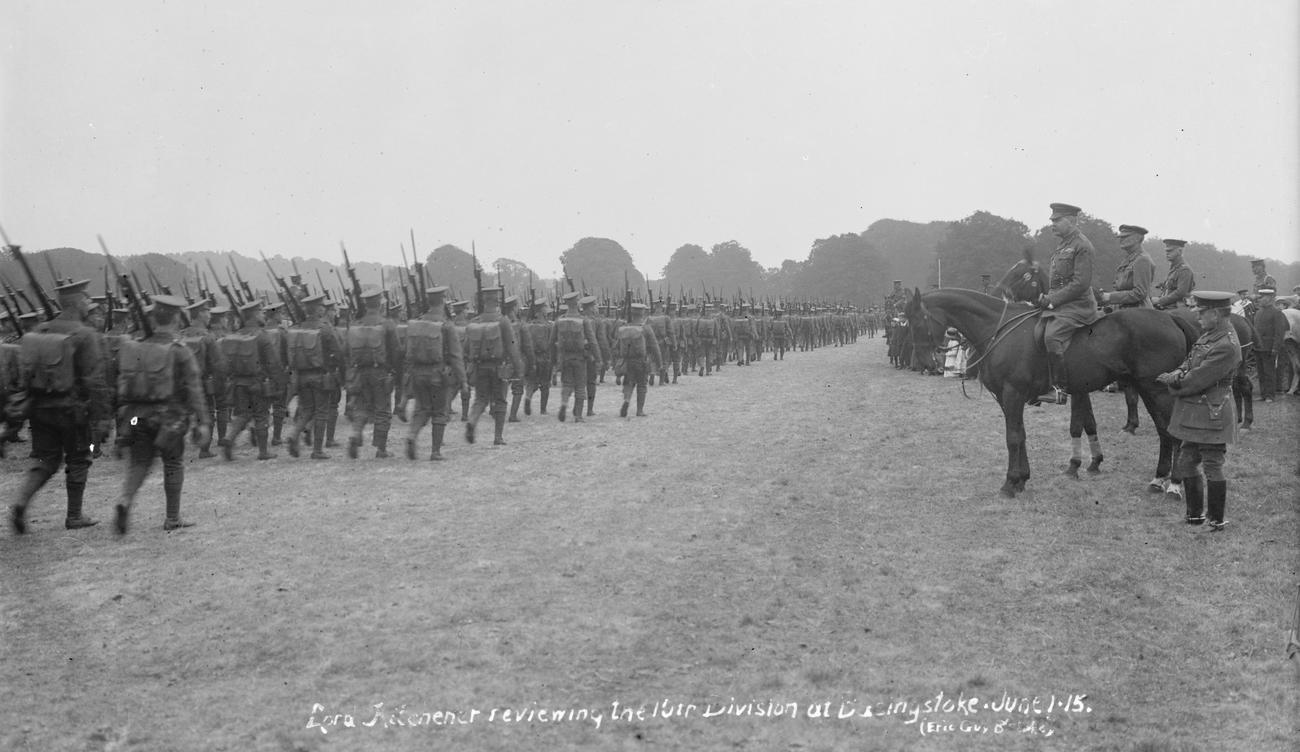
Lord Kitchener, on the right on horseback, reviewing the 10th (Irish) Division at Basingstoke, Hampshire, June 1915.

Formed in Ireland on 21 August 1914, the 10th Division was sent to Gallipoli where, as part of Lieutenant General Sir Frederick Stopford's IX Corps, at Suvla Bay on 7 August it participated in the Landing at Suvla Bay and the August offensive. Some battalions of the division were landed at Anzac and fought at Chunuk Bair.

In September 1915, when the Suvla front became a stalemate, the division was moved to Salonika where it remained for almost two years and fought the Battle of Kosturino.

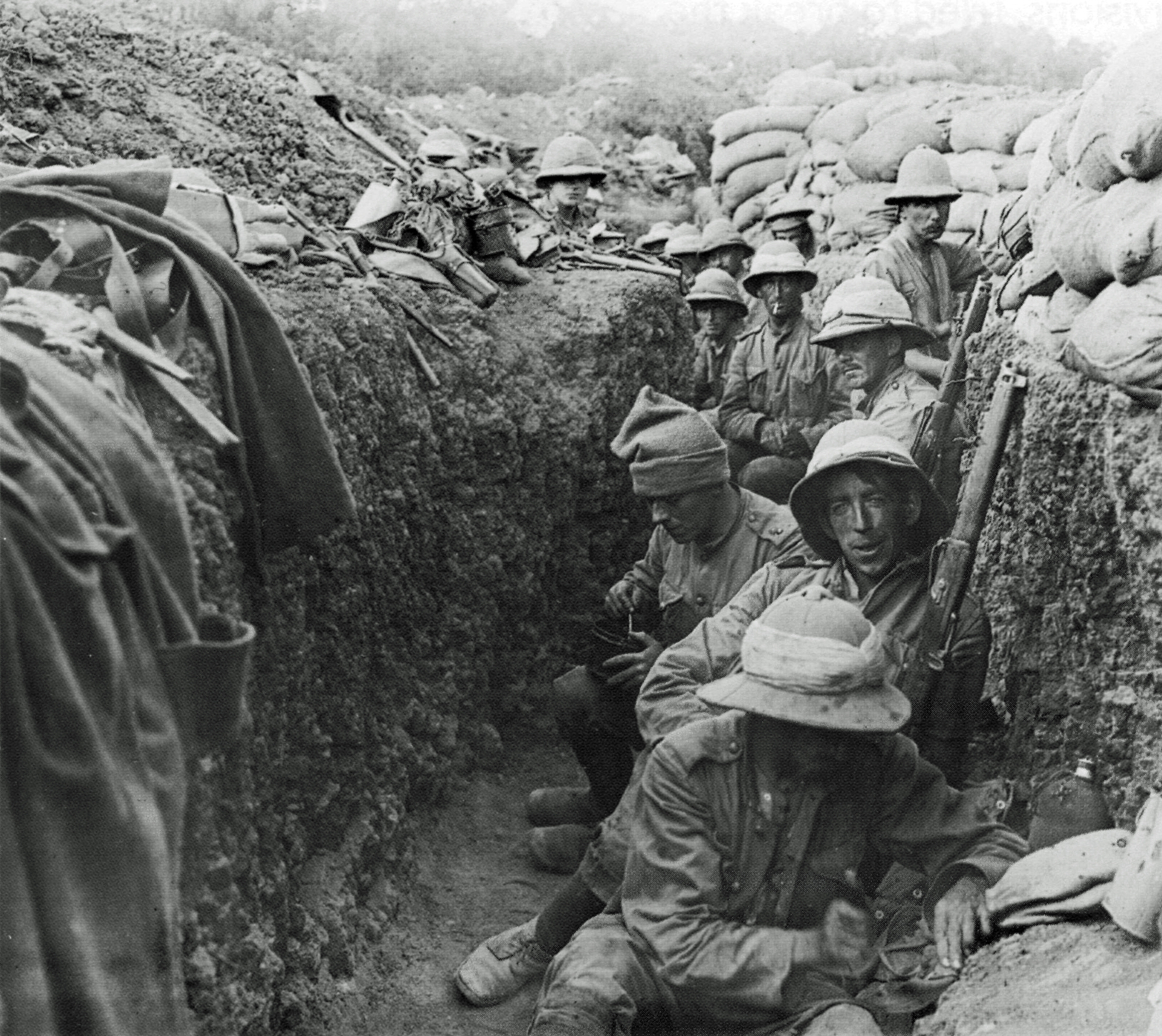
Men of the 5th (Service) Battalion, Royal Irish Fusiliers, the divisional pioneers, shelter in the trenches on the Gallipoli Peninsula, August 1915.

The division moved to Egypt in September 1917 where it joined Lieutenant General Sir Philip Chetwode's XX Corps. It fought in the Third Battle of Gaza which succeeded in breaking the resistance of the Turkish defenders in southern Palestine.

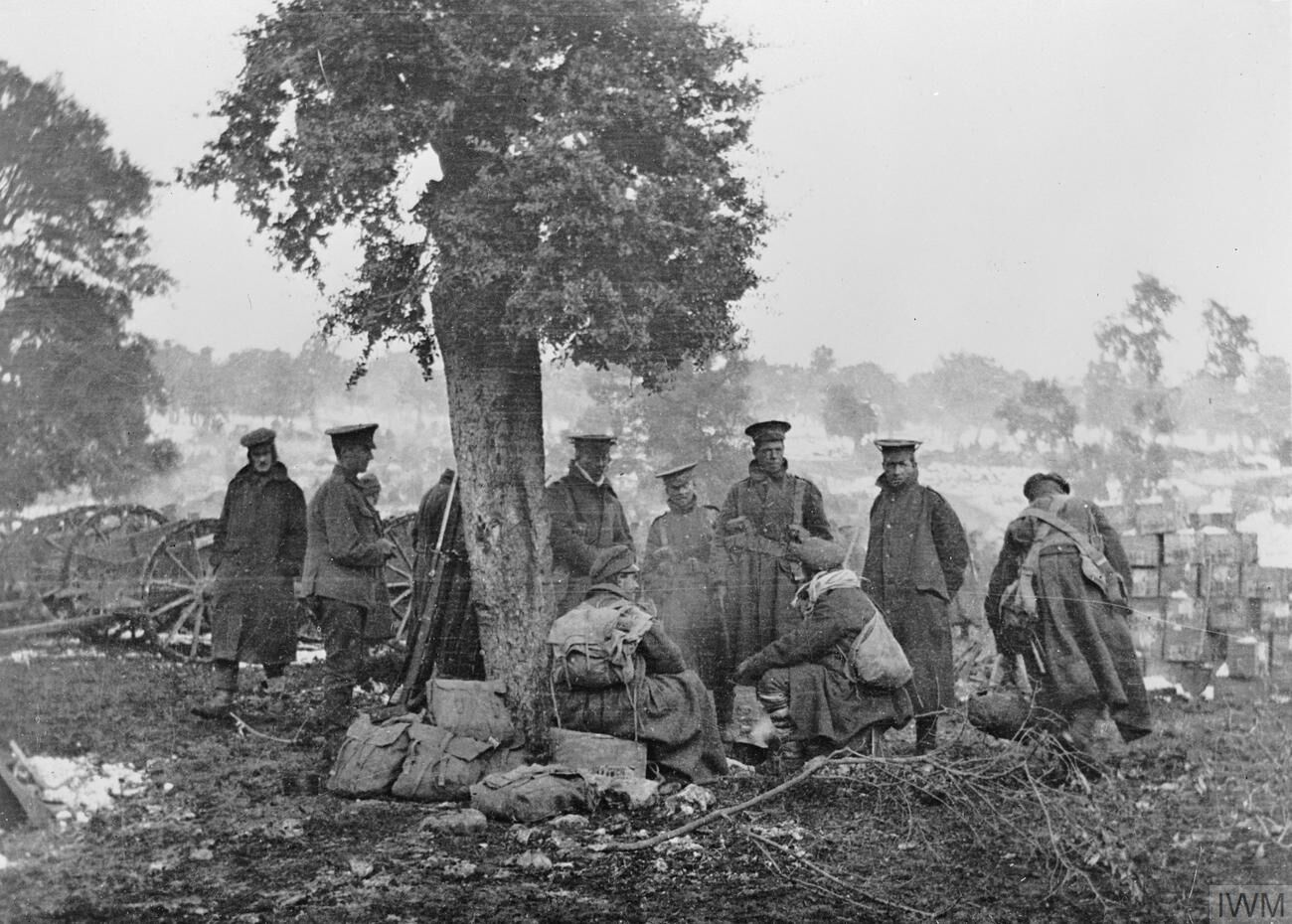
Men of the 5th (Service) Battalion, Connaught Rangers with two Bulgarian prisoners at Tatarli, 28 November 1915.

Heavy losses on the Western Front following Operation Michael, the great German spring offensive in 1918, resulted in the transfer of ten of the division's battalions from Palestine to France, their place being taken by Indian Army units. This left only one British battalion per brigade. The remainder of the division remained in Palestine until the end of the war with Turkey on 31 October 1918.

On 12 November 1918 the division concentrated at Sarafand, ready for moving back to Egypt. By 1 December it had returned to Cairo.

== Order of battle ==
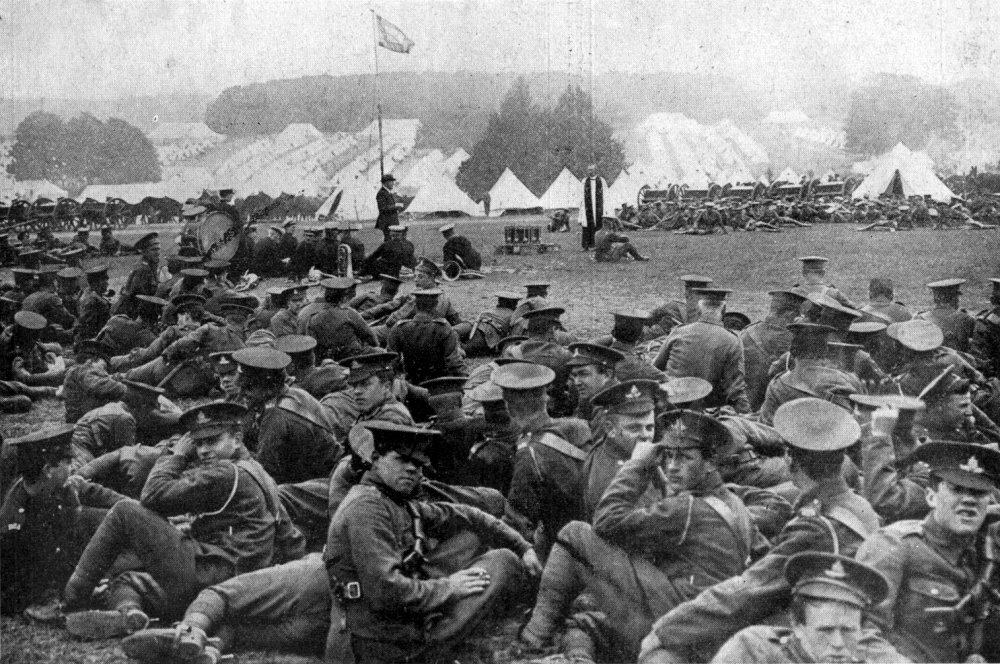
A church service at the 10th (Irish) Division's Basingstoke camp, 1915

The division comprised the following brigades:

29th Brigade

- 5th Battalion, Royal Irish Regiment (left June 1915 to become the divisional pioneer battalion)
- 6th (Service) Battalion, Royal Irish Rifles (disbanded May 1918)
- 5th (Service) Battalion, Connaught Rangers (left April 1918)
- 6th (Service) Battalion, Prince of Wales's Leinster Regiment (Royal Canadians) (left April 1918)
- 10th (Service) Battalion, Hampshire Regiment (joined March left October 1915)
- 1st Battalion, Prince of Wales's Leinster Regiment (Royal Canadians) (joined November 1916)
- 29th Machine Gun Company (formed 10 May 1916 left to move into 10th Battalion Machine Gun Corps (M.G.C.) 7 May 1918)
- 29th Trench Mortar Battery (joined 2 October 1916 as No 7 Stokes Mortar Battery transferred to Divisional TMB 17 October 1917)

The brigade was reorganised with Indian Army units from April to June 1918

- 1st Battalion, Prince of Wales's Leinster Regiment (Royal Canadians)
- 1st Battalion, 54th Sikhs (joined 27 April 1918)
- 1st Battalion, 101st Grenadiers (joined 30 April 1918)
- 2nd Battalion, 151st Sikh Infantry (joined 10 June 1918)

30th Brigade

- 6th (Service) Battalion, Royal Munster Fusiliers (left 30 April 1918)
- 7th (Service) Battalion, Royal Munster Fusiliers (absorbed by the 6th Battalion 3 November 1916)
- 6th (Service) Battalion, Royal Dublin Fusiliers (left 27 May 1918)
- 7th (Service) Battalion, Royal Dublin Fusiliers (left 30 April 1918)
- 1st Battalion, Royal Irish Regiment (joined 3 November 1916)
- 30th Machine Gun Company (formed 10 May 1916, left to move into 10th Battalion M.G.C. 7 May 1918)
- 30th Trench Mortar Battery (joined 28 September 1916 as No 8 Stokes Mortar Battery, transferred to Divisional TMB 17 October 1917)

The brigade was reorganised with Indian Army units from April to June 1918

- 1st Battalion, Royal Irish Regiment
- 38th Dogras (joined 29 April 1918)
- 1st Battalion, Kashmir Rifles (joined 30 April 1918)
- 46th Punjabis (joined 25 May 1918)

31st Brigade

- 5th (Service) Battalion, Royal Inniskilling Fusiliers (left 28 May 1918)
- 6th (Service) Battalion, Royal Inniskilling Fusiliers (left 2 May 1918)
- 5th (Service) Battalion, Princess Victoria's (Royal Irish Fusiliers) (left 30 April 1918)
- 6th (Service) Battalion, Princess Victoria's (Royal Irish Fusiliers) (absorbed by the 5th Battalion 2 November 1916, )
- 2nd Battalion, Princess Victoria's (Royal Irish Fusiliers) (joined 2 November 1916)
- 31st Machine Gun Company (formed 11 May 1916, left to move into 10th Battalion M.G.C. 7 May 1918)
- 31st Trench Mortar Battery (joined 17 October 1916, transferred to Divisional TMB 17 October 1917)

The brigade was reorganised with Indian Army units from April to June 1918

- 6th (Service) Battalion, Princess Victoria's (Royal Irish Fusiliers)
- 74th Punjabis (joined 29 April 1918)
- 2nd Battalion, 101st Grenadiers (joined 1 May 1918)
- 38th (Service) Battalion, Royal Fusiliers (attached 11 June – 17 July 1918)
- 2nd Battalion, 42nd Deoli Regiment (joined 18 July 1918); Pioneers :

Divisional Troops

- 5th (Service) Battalion, Royal Irish Regiment (joined as Divisional Pioneer Battalion June 1915, left April 1918)
- 2nd Battalion, 155th Pioneers (Indian pioneers)(from July 1918)
- Divisional Trench Mortar Battery (formed 17 October 1917, broken up 9 June 1918)
- Divisional Mounted Troops
  - 10th Divisional Cyclist Company, Army Cyclist Corps (left 7 December 1916)
- 10th Divisional Train Army Service Corps
  - 108th, 109th, 110th and 111th Companies (left October 1915)
  - 471st, 472nd, 473rd and 474th Companies (joined October 1915 from 52nd Division)
- 25th Mobile Veterinary Section Army Veterinary Corps
- 212th Divisional Employment Company (formed by 23 June 1917)

Royal Artillery

- LIV Brigade, Royal Field Artillery (R.F.A.) (left 29 August 1917)
- LV Brigade, R.F.A. (left January 1916)
- LVI Brigade, R.F.A. (left January 1916)
- LVII (Howitzer) Brigade, R.F.A. (left 28 August 1917)
- 10th Divisional Ammunition Column R.F.A. (Note: the original column did not go overseas with the Division. The 29th Divisional Ammunition Column joined in Egypt in October 1915. Suffered losses when transport “Marquette” torpedoed off Salonika on 23 October. Numbers were made up by men, horses and equipment from 42nd Division Ammunition Column. Formally renumbered 10th DAC on 4 March 1916)
- LXVII Brigade, R.F.A. (joined October 1915)
- LXVIII Brigade, R.F.A. (joined October 1915)
- 10th Heavy Battery Royal Garrison Artillery (R.G.A.) (joined March 1915, left by 10 August 1915)
- 15th Heavy Battery R.G.A. (joined 10 August 1915, left by 19 December 1915)
- IV Highland (Mountain) Brigade, R.G.A. (joined 13 August 1915)
- 2nd Mountain Battery R.G.A. (joined 30 December 1915, left 27 February 1916)
- CXXXII (Howitzer) Brigade, R.F.A. (joined 26 April 1916, broken up 25 January 1917)
- Hong Kong & Singapore Mountain Battery R.G.A. (joined 1 September 1918, left 26 October 1918)

Royal Engineers

- 65th Field Company (left 14 July 1918)
- 66th Field Company
- 85th Field Company (joined January 1915)
- 10th Divisional Signals Company
- 18/3 Sappers & Miners (joined by 17 July 1918)

Royal Army Medical Corps

- 30th, 31st and 32nd Field Ambulances (left 20 May 1918)
- 154th, 165th and 166th Camel Field Ambulances (joined 20 May 1918)
- 21st Sanitary Section (left 31 July 1915, rejoined October 1915, left again 22 October 1917)
- 18th Sanitary Section (joined 22 October 1917)

== Battles and engagements ==
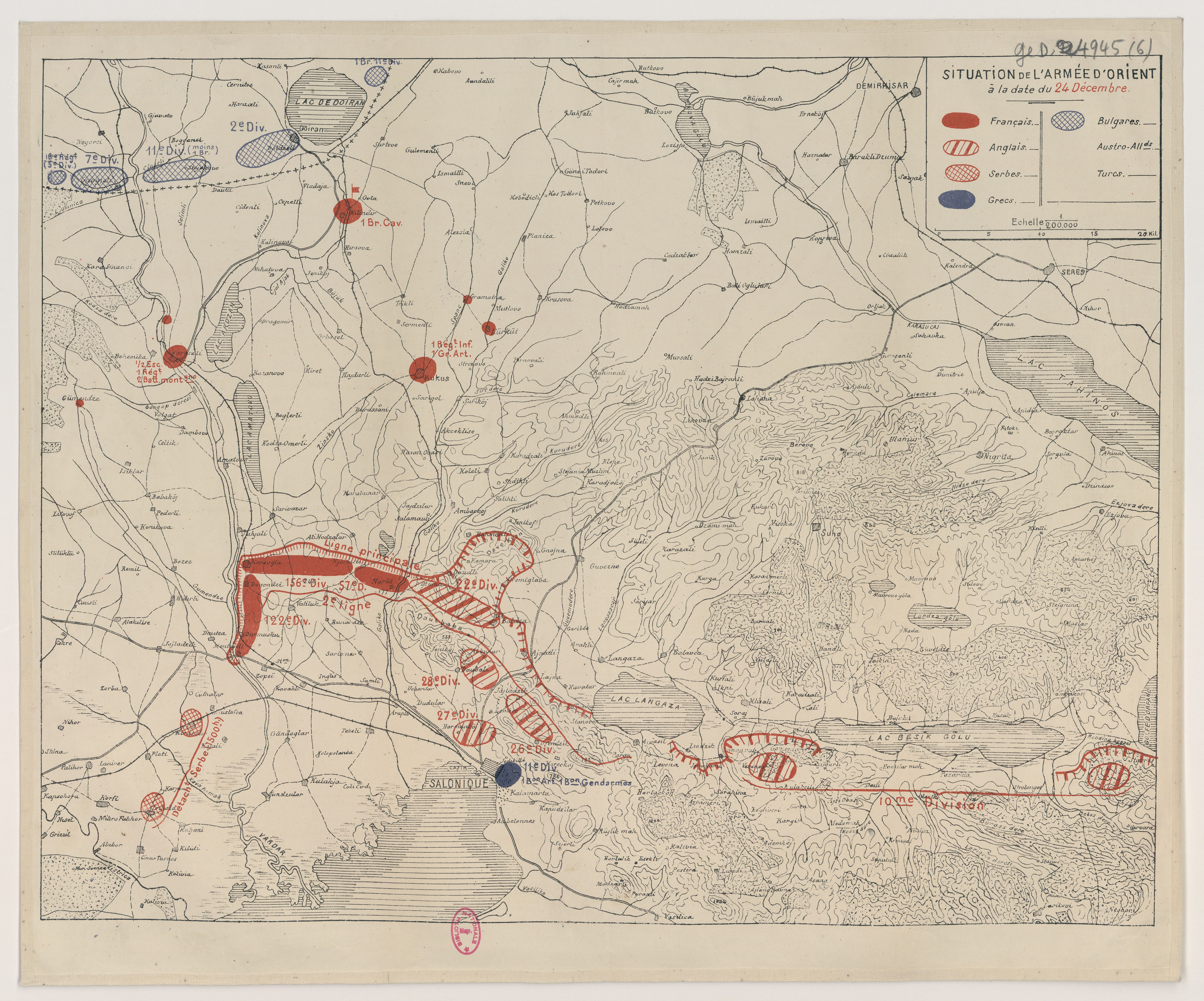
Salonika front

Gallipoli Campaign

- The landing at Suvla.
- Battle of Sari Bair.
- Capture of Chocolate Hill.
- Hill 60.

Salonika front

- Battle of Kosturino.
- Retreat from Serbia.
- Capture of the Karajokois.
- Capture of Yenikoi.

Sinai and Palestine Campaign

- Third Battle of Gaza.
- Capture of the Sheria Position.
- Capture of Jerusalem.
- Defence of Jerusalem.
- Tell 'Asure.
- Battle of Nablus.

== General Officers Commanding ==
Commanders included:

- 24 August 1914 – 16 August 1915: Lieutenant-General Sir Bryan Mahon
- 16–19 August 1915: Brigadier-General F. F. Hill (acting)
- 19–23 August 1915: Major-General William Peyton
- 23 August – 18 November 1915: Lieutenant-General Sir Bryan Mahon
- 18 November – 20 December 1915: Brigadier-General L. L. Nicol (acting)
- 20 December 1915 – 12 July 1916: Major-General John Longley
- 12 July – 24 September 1916: Brigadier-General L. L. Nicol (acting)
- 24 September 1916 – 11 June 1918: Major-General John Longley
- 11 June – 18 August 1918: Brigadier-General E. M. Morris (acting)
- 18 August 1918 – June 1919: Major-General John Longley
- June 1919 – 1921: Major-General Sir George Gorringe

== Great War Memorials ==
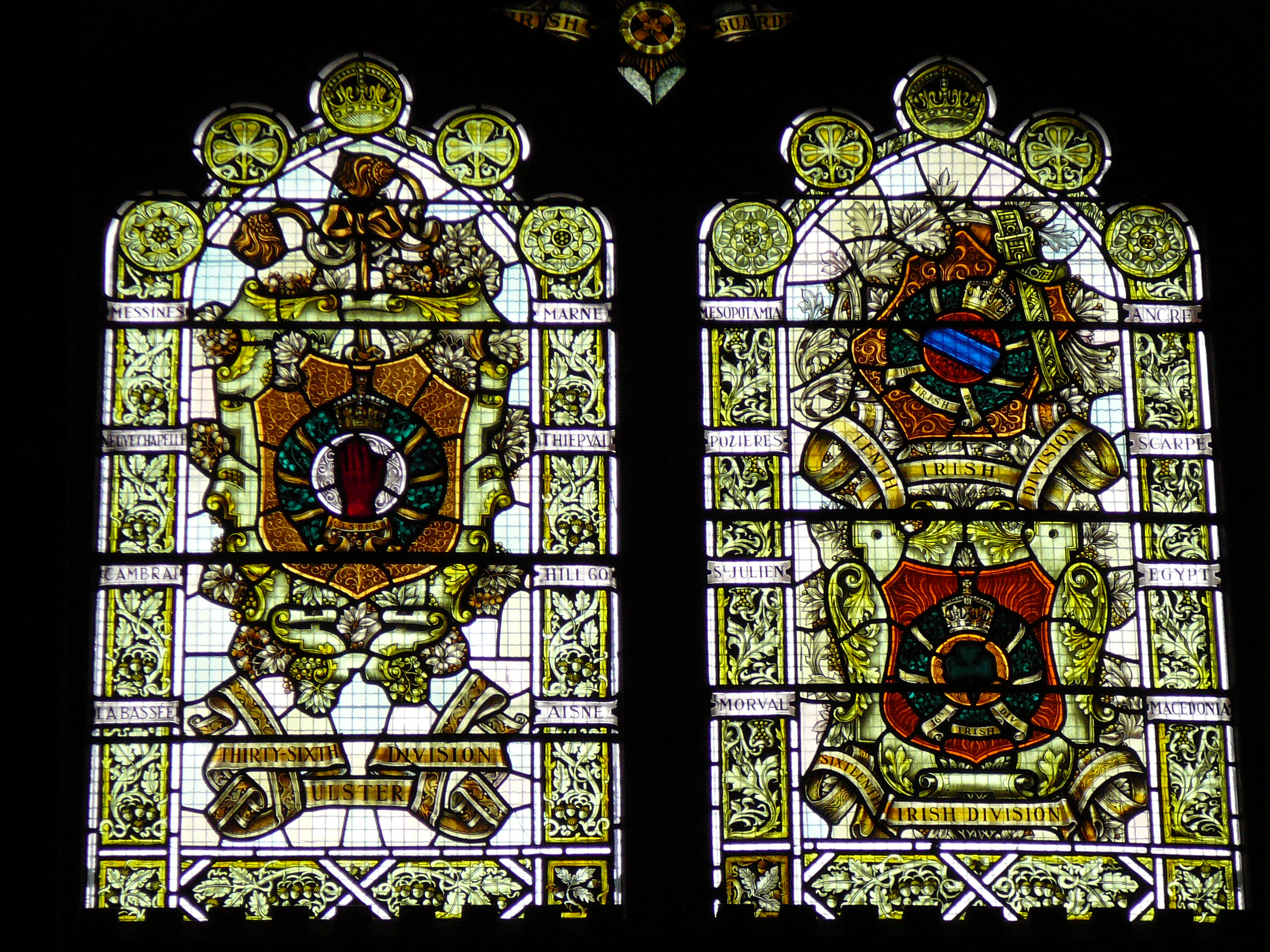
Guildhall Derry stained-glass window which commemorates the Three Irish Divisions, left the 36th, right the 10th and 16th

- Irish National War Memorial Gardens Dublin.
- Island of Ireland Peace Park Messines, Belgium.
- Menin Gate Memorial Ypres, Belgium.
- Ulster Tower Memorial Thiepval, France.
- Dojran Celtic Cross, Doiran Lake, Macedonia.

== See also ==
- 16th (Irish) Division
- 36th (Ulster) Division
- Irish regiments
- List of British divisions in World War I
