= Provatas =

Provatas Προβατάς
- Community
- Location within Greece
- Coordinates: 41°06′N 23°38′E
- Country: Greece
- Administrative region: Central Macedonia
- Regional unit: Serres
- Municipality: Serres
- Municipal unit: Kapetan Mitrousi

Population (2021)
  - Community: 829
- Time zone: UTC+2 (EET)
  - Summer (DST): UTC+3 (EEST)

Provatas (Greek: Προβατάς) is a larger village in Kapetan Mitrousi, Serres regional unit, northern Greece. It has 829 inhabitants (2021 census).

Until 1923, the village was called Yenikoi or Yeniköy and inhabited mostly by Turks and Bulgarians.
It was hard fought over on October 3 and 4, 1916, between the 10th (Irish) Division and the Bulgarian Army. The Irish took and held the village, despite fierce and costly counterattacks by the Bulgarians.
