= Ernest Seaman =

Recipient of the Victoria Cross

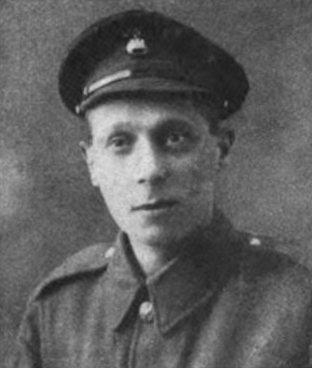
- Born: 16 August 1893; Heigham, Norfolk, England
- Died: 29 September 1918 (aged 25) †; Terhand, Belgium
- Military career
- Allegiance: United Kingdom
- Branch: British Army
- Service years: 1915–1918
- Rank: Lance Corporal
- Units: Army Service Corps; The Royal Inniskilling Fusiliers
- Conflicts: First World War: Hundred Days Offensive; Fifth Battle of Ypres †
- Awards: Victoria Cross; Military Medal

Ernest Seaman VC, MM (16 August 1893 – 29 September 1918) was an English recipient of the Victoria Cross, the highest and most prestigious award for gallantry in the face of the enemy that can be awarded to British and Commonwealth forces. A soldier with The Royal Inniskilling Fusiliers, he was posthumously awarded the VC for his actions on 29 September 1918, during the Hundred Days Offensive of the First World War.

== Early life ==
Ernest Seaman was born on 16 August 1893, in the village of Heigham, near Norwich, to Henry and Sarah Seaman, who already had a daughter. His father died while Seaman was still a child but his mother was later remarried, to a publican. The family ran an inn near Scole. Educated at Scole Primary School, on finishing his schooling Seaman moved to Trimley to live with an aunt and work as a page boy in the Grand Hotel in Felixstowe. Emigrated to Canada in 1912.

== First World War ==
On the outbreak of the First World War, Seaman returned to the United Kingdom and tried to enlist in the British Army. He was initially rejected, but he subsequently enlisted at Le Havre. However, he was classified as unfit for active frontline service and was posted to the catering division of the Army Service Corps in late 1915. As the war progressed, the high casualty rates in the British Expeditionary Force saw standards for frontline service lowered and Seaman was transferred to an infantry unit, the 2nd Battalion of The Royal Inniskilling Fusiliers. Serving in the Ypres salient, he was soon awarded the Military Medal (MM) for attending, while under fire, to fellow soldiers who had been wounded. The recommendation for his MM was made by his company commander.

As part of the 36th (Ulster) Division, Seaman's battalion was engaged in the Fifth Battle of Ypres, a battle of the Hundred Days Offensive, on 29 September 1918. It was tasked with the capture of Terhand. After initial good progress, the battalion was held up by German machine-gun posts. Seaman, a lance corporal operating a Lewis gun, played a key role in getting the advance restarted although he was killed in the process. Afterwards, his bravery was recognised with a posthumous award of the Victoria Cross (VC). The VC, instituted in 1856, was the highest award for valour that could be bestowed on a soldier of the British Empire. The citation for his VC read:

For most conspicuous bravery and devotion to duty. When the right flank of his company was held up by a nest of enemy machine guns, he, with great courage and initiative, rushed forward under heavy fire with his Lewis gun and engaged the position single-handed, capturing two machine guns and twelve prisoners and killing one officer and two men. Later in the day he again rushed another enemy machine-gun position, capturing the gun under heavy fire. He was killed immediately after. His courage and dash were beyond all praise, and it was entirely due to the very gallant conduct of Lce. Cpl. Seaman that his company was enabled to push forward to its objective and capture many prisoners.

— The London Gazette, 12 November 1918

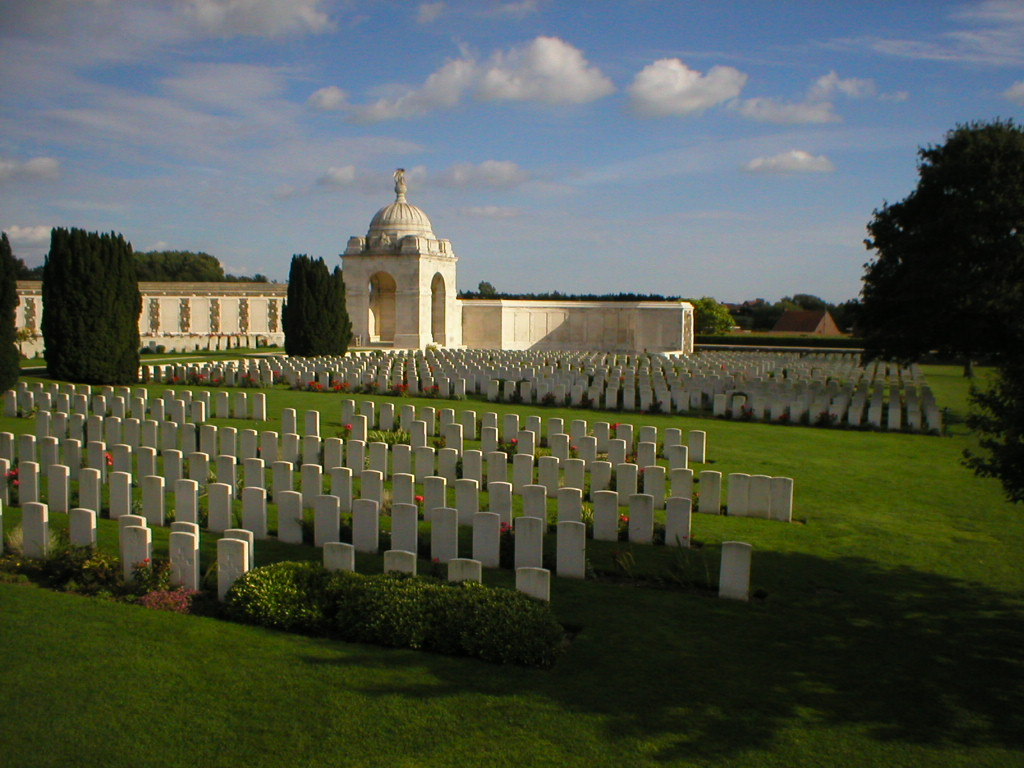
The Tyne Cot Memorial to the Missing, shown here in the background, includes a commemoration to Seaman.

Seaman has no known grave but is commemorated at the Tyne Cot Memorial to the Missing near Ypres, the memorial to the 36th Division at the Ulster Tower near Thiepval on the Somme, Felixstowe War Memorial in Suffolk, and the Scole War Memorial in Norfolk. King George V presented Seaman's VC to his mother in a ceremony at Buckingham Palace on 13 February 1919.

Seaman is the subject of a short story entitled "Unfit for Active Service" by Ruth Dugdall. It was published in 2018 as part of an anthology to commemorate the centenary of the end of World War One. Entitled The Many Faces of 1918, the anthology is a collection of original stories from across Europe, chosen by the embassies of those countries. Unfit for Active Service was chosen by John Marshall, the British Ambassador to Luxembourg.

== Medal ==
Seaman's VC is held at the museum of the successor to the Army Service Corps, The Royal Logistic Corps. As well as the MM, he was also entitled to several campaign medals, including the 1914–1915 Star, the British War Medal, and the Victory Medal.
