= Clandeboye Estate =

Country estate in County Down, Northern Ireland

Coordinates: 54.642°N 5.717°W

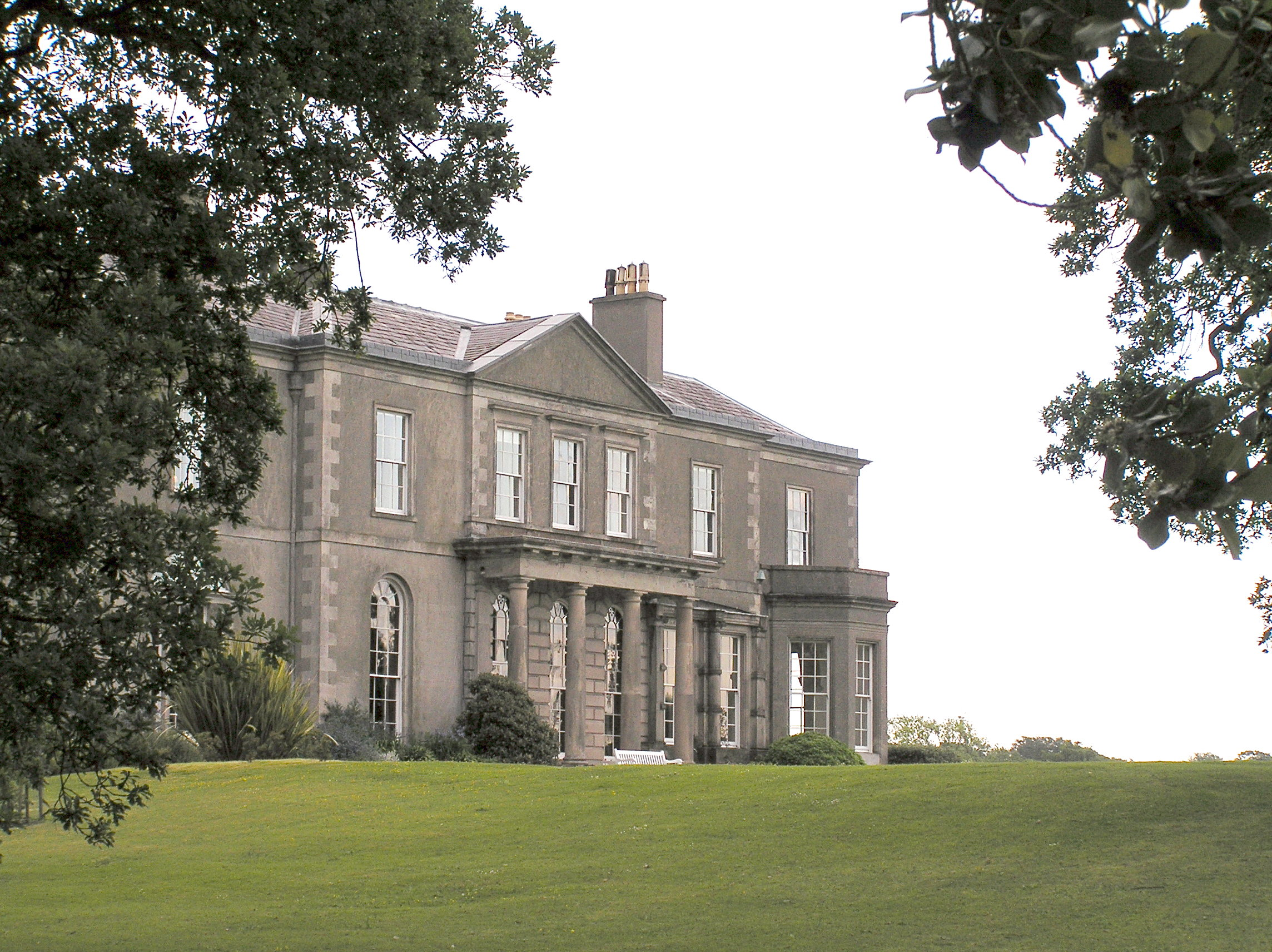
Clandeboye House

Clandeboye Avenue was a private lane leading from the Clandeboye Estate to near the shore at Helen's Bay. This section, close to the station at Helen's Bay, is now a public lane. The bridge (just about visible through the trees) carries the Belfast-Bangor railway line.

The Clandeboye Estate is a country estate in Bangor, County Down, Northern Ireland, 12 miles (19 km) outside Belfast. Covering 2,000 acres (8.1 km^{2}), it contains woodlands, formal and walled gardens, lawns, a lake, and 250 hectares (620 acres) of farmland. Named after the former Gaelic territory of Clandeboye, the estate was the home of Lindy, Marchioness of Dufferin and Ava, widow of the last Marquess (the title being extinct), until her death in October 2020.

== History ==
The estate, first settled in 1674, was originally named Ballyleidy, after the townland in which it lay. The current Clandeboye House was built in 1801–1804 to a design by Robert Woodgate that incorporated elements of the previous building and was built for the politician Sir James Blackwood, 2nd Baron Dufferin and Clandeboye. It was named after the former Gaelic Irish territory of Clandeboye, which covered swathes of north County Down and south County Antrim.

In memory of his mother, Helen, Lady Dufferin (granddaughter of the playwright Richard Brinsley Sheridan), Lord Dufferin and Ava built the stone edifice Helen's Tower on the estate, which has since been immortalised by Tennyson in the poem of the same name. The tower has taken on an unforeseen poignancy, as an almost exact replica of it, the Ulster Tower, was built at Thiepval to honour the men of the 36th (Ulster) Division who fell at the Battle of the Somme. The estate was used for army training during the First World War, and the 36th (Ulster) Division trained beside Helen's Tower before leaving for France. The tower can be reached via the Ulster Way, a five-mile (8 km) section of which traverses the estate.

The parklands familiar to visitors today were originally laid out by the 1st Marquess, who was also responsible for the addition of the banqueting hall to the house in 1898.

== Flora and fauna ==
As a result of the work of the 1st Marquess, Clandeboye is home to the largest area of broad-leaved woodland in Northern Ireland, consisting mostly of oak, birch, and beech. The estate is also home to a large variety of animal species; those recorded as present on the estate include the osprey, red kite, tree sparrow, barn owl, yellowhammer, song thrush, pipistrelle bat, red squirrel, fallow deer, common newt, marsh fritillary, and the wall brown butterfly.

== Publication ==
The 2011 BBC television series The Country House Revealed was accompanied by a full length illustrated companion book, which featured Clandeboye Estate as a dedicated chapter appearing as Chapter Five of the book edition. The six chapters of the book correspond to the six episodes of the BBC series.

The estate is also the inspiration for Dunmartin Hall in the 1977 novel Great Granny Webster by Caroline Blackwood, who lived at the hall as a child.
