= Island of Ireland Peace Park =

World War I memorial in Belgium

- Belgium
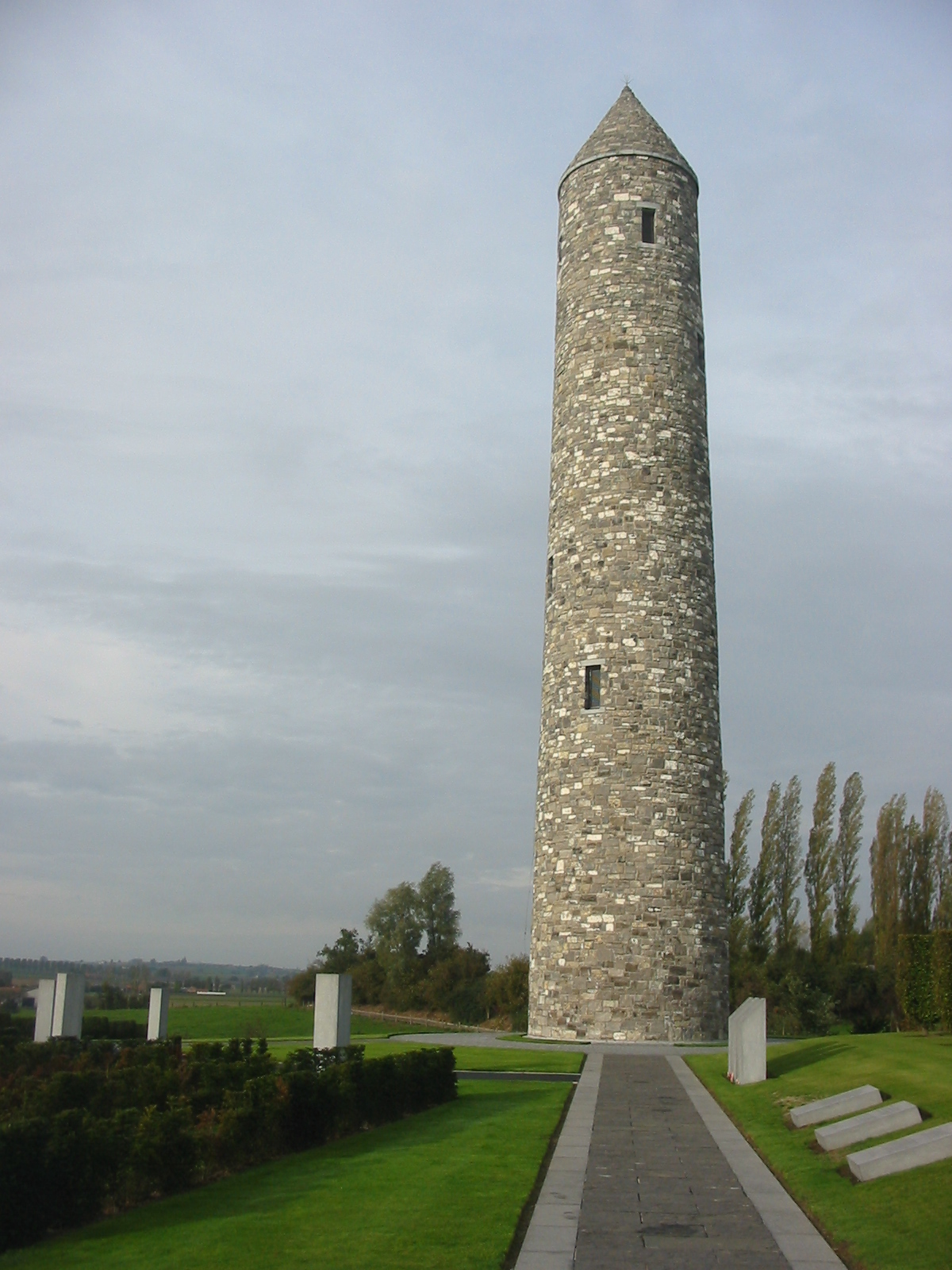
- The Peace Park's symbolic Irish Round Tower.
- For the soldiers of the island of Ireland who died, were wounded or are missing from World War I
- Unveiled: 11 November 1998; 27 years ago
- Location: 50°45′35.28″N 2°53′41.13″E near Mesen, West Flanders, Belgium
- Designed by: Traditional Irish round tower

UNESCO World Heritage Site
- Official name: Funerary and memory sites of the First World War (Western Front)
- Type: Cultural
- Criteria: i, ii, vi
- Designated: 2023 (45th session)
- Reference no.: 1567-FL26

The Island of Ireland Peace Park and its surrounding park (Irish: Páirc Síochána d'Oileán na hÉireann), also called the Irish Peace Park (Dutch: Iers Vredespark) or Irish Peace Tower in Messines, near Ypres in Flanders, Belgium, is a war memorial to the soldiers of the island of Ireland who died, were wounded or are missing from World War I, during Ireland's involvement in the conflict. The tower memorial is close to the site of the June 1917 battle of Messines Ridge, during which the Catholic Irish Nationalist 16th (Irish) Division fought alongside the Protestant Unionist 36th (Ulster) Division.

== Development ==
Because of the events of the Easter Rising in 1916 and the partition of Ireland under the Anglo-Irish Treaty in 1922 and the Irish Civil War that followed it, little was done in the Republic of Ireland to commemorate the Irish dead from the Great War or World War II. Those countries who were engaged in the Great War all preserve the memory of their fallen soldiers with national monuments in the Western Front area. That led to some ill feelings in the already-crowded emotions of the conflict on the island and perhaps was highlighted when Northern Ireland's Ulster Tower, in Thiepval, France, was one of the first memorials erected.

The tower memorial, however, serves not to "redress the balance" but rather to recall the sacrifices of those from the island of Ireland from all political and religious traditions who fought and died in the war. It also serves as a symbol of modern-day reconciliation. The tower houses bronze cubicles containing record books listing the known dead, which are publicly accessible copies of the originals belonging to the National War Memorial, Islandbridge, Dublin.

The project was initiated by a member of the Dáil Éireann, Paddy Harte, who, together with a community activist, Glen Barr, from Northern Ireland, established 'A Journey of Reconciliation Trust'. The trust was a broad-based, cross-border, organisation with offices in Dublin. The trust was made up of representatives of the main churches in Ireland and professional political and representatives and community leaders from both parts of Ireland under the leadership of Harte and Barr.

The Irish government became involved in part funding the project, together with the Northern Ireland Office. Statutory and private bodies rolled in behind the project and within two years of the initiation of the JRT the Island of Ireland Peace Park and Celtic Round Tower was complete. It was formally opened by the Irish President Mary McAleese, who, in the presence of Queen Elizabeth II of the United Kingdom and King Albert II of Belgium, led the wreath-laying ceremony on the afternoon of 11 November 1998. It was the first time an Irish State officially acknowledged the soldiers from Ireland who died in World War I. This was also a seminal moment in Irish history when an Irish head of state and a British monarch met publicly in a joint ceremony. The park is maintained by the Commonwealth War Graves Commission on behalf of the Office of Public Works in Ireland. Prior to the Island of Ireland Peace Park, no Irish government dignitary had ever attended any World War I remembrance service either in Ireland or at the Menin Gate. At an official ceremony on 11 November 1998, the Irish President apologised on behalf of the Republic of Ireland to the families of the fallen for what she called the 'national amnesia' in remembering the soldiers of World War I from the island of Ireland.

== Design ==
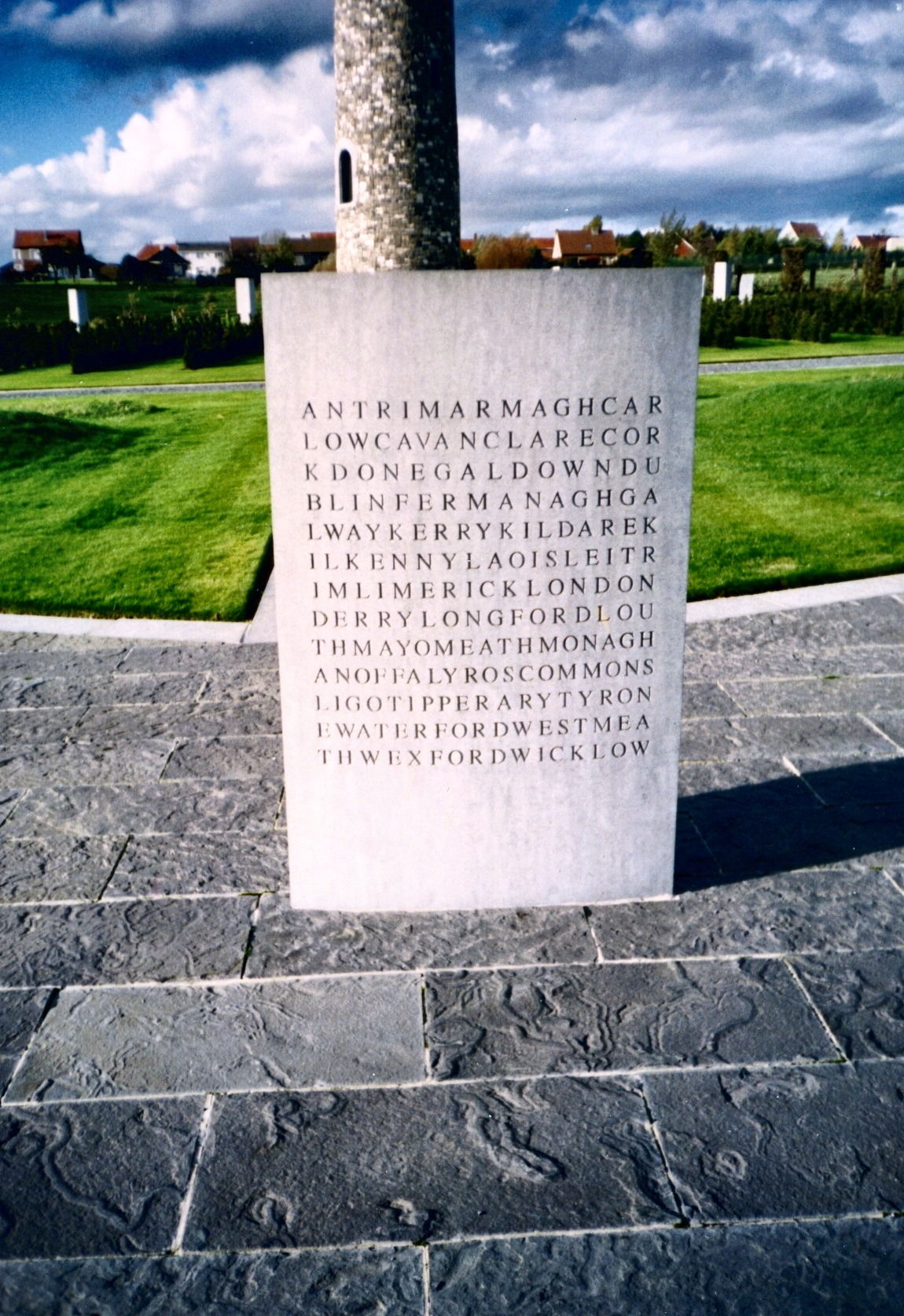
The counties of Ireland, symbolically run together

The 110-foot (34 m) tower is in the traditional design of an Irish round tower and is partially built with stone from a former British Army barracks in Tipperary, the remainder of the stone from a work-house outside Mullingar, County Westmeath.

The design has a unique aspect that allows the sun to light the interior only on the 11th hour of the 11th day of the 11th month, the anniversary of the armistice that ended the war and the time for the minute's silence on Remembrance Day.

A commemorative ceremony is held yearly in the park on Armistice Day in conjunction with similar ceremonies at the nearby multi-national Menin Gate Memorial in Ypres.

== Unveiling ==
The tower was unveiled in the afternoon on 11 November 1998 by President Mary McAleese of Ireland, in the presence of Queen Elizabeth II of the United Kingdom and King Albert II of Belgium.

In her speech, President McAleese said:

Today's ceremony at the Peace Park was not just another journey down a well-travelled path. For much of the past eighty years, the very idea of such a ceremony would probably have been unthinkable.
Those whom we commemorate here were doubly tragic. They fell victim to a war against oppression in Europe. Their memory too fell victim to a war for independence at home in Ireland.

— Mary McAleese

Speaking at the Park on the anniversary of the Battle of Messines Ridge on 7 June 2004, the Irish Minister for Foreign Affairs Dermot Ahern commented that honouring the spirit of the Irish killed in the First World War can teach how to advance the peace process in Northern Ireland. adding:

All those untold human stories that we lost in the first World War and more recently in the conflict in Northern Ireland, must be remembered. And, in remembering, they must not be told for nothing. They must not be told to deepen divisions. They must be told to inspire us to overcome them.

— Dermot Ahern

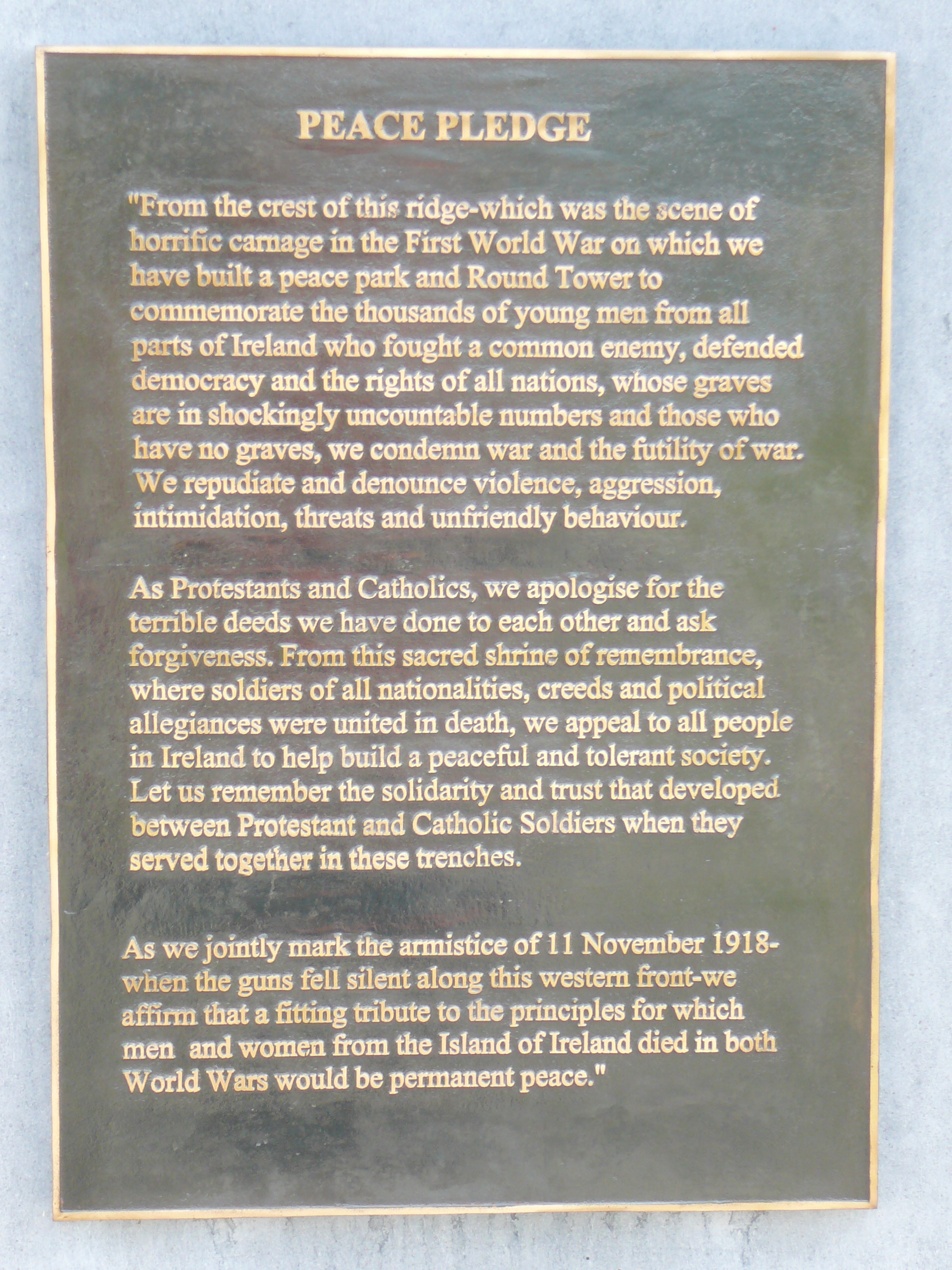
Peace Pledge plaque, in the park's centre circle

== Peace Pledge ==
A bronze tablet on a granite pillar positioned in the centre circle of the park bears the following inscription, entitled:

Peace Pledge

From the crest of this ridge, which was the scene of terrific carnage in the First World War on which we have built a peace park and Round Tower to commemorate the thousands of young men from all parts of Ireland who fought a common enemy, defended democracy and the rights of all nations, whose graves are in shockingly uncountable numbers and those who have no graves, we condemn war and the futility of war. We repudiate and denounce violence, aggression, intimidation, threats and unfriendly behaviour.

As Protestants and Catholics, we apologise for the terrible deeds we have done to each other and ask forgiveness. From this sacred shrine of remembrance, where soldiers of all nationalities, creeds and political allegiances were united in death, we appeal to all people in Ireland to help build a peaceful and tolerant society. Let us remember the solidarity and trust that developed between Protestant and Catholic soldiers when they served together in these trenches.

As we jointly thank the armistice of 11 November 1918 – when the guns fell silent along this western front - we affirm that a fitting tribute to the principles for which men and women from the Island of Ireland died in both World Wars would be permanent peace.

== The park ==
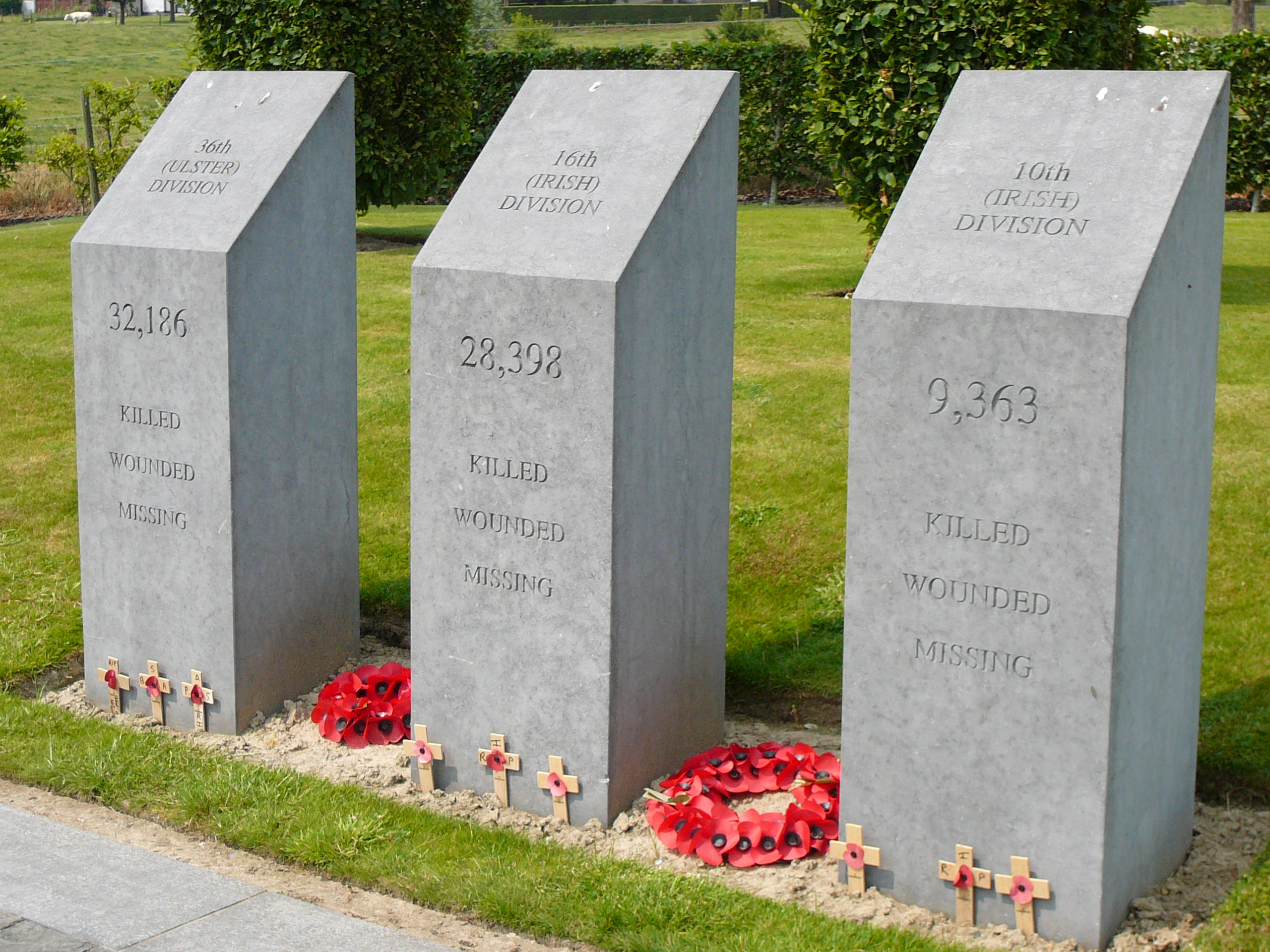
The three pillars giving the killed, wounded and missing of the three voluntary Irish Divisions.

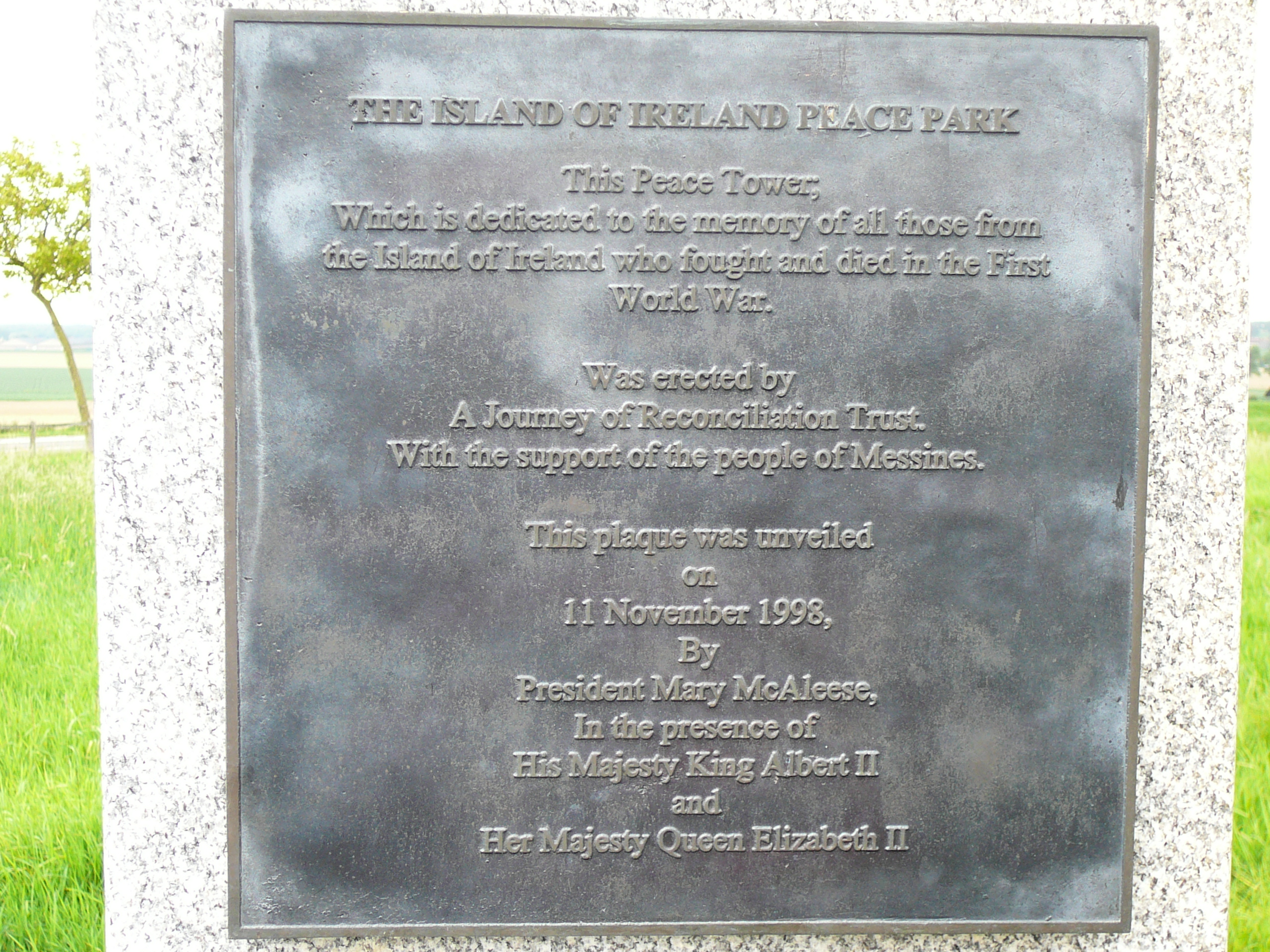
Plaque commemorating the opening and dedication of the park.

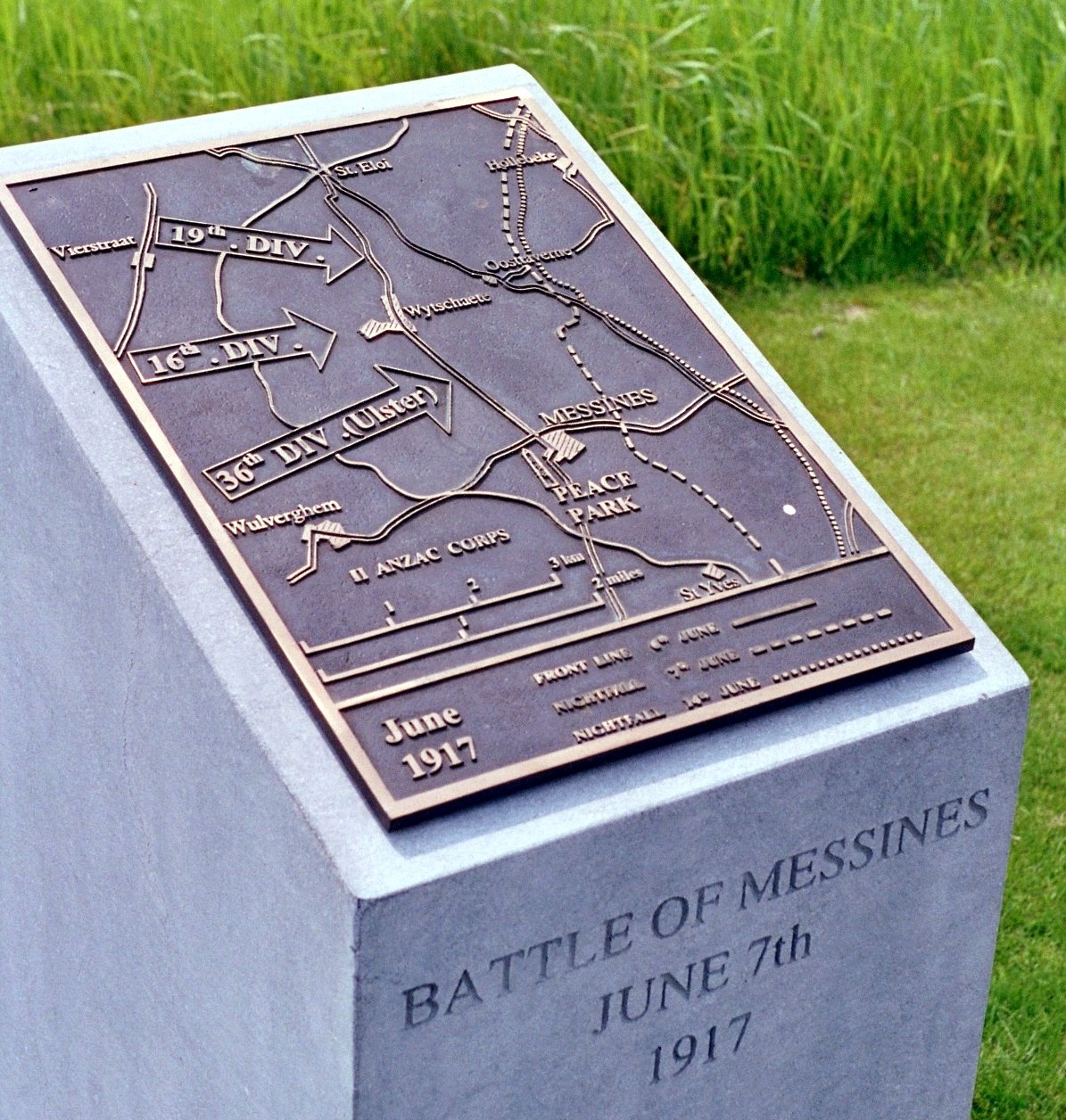
Plaque overview of the Battle of Messines.

- Inside the entrance gate on the left are four granite pillars with plaques in four languages (Irish, English, Dutch and French), commemorating the dedication and opening and dedication of the park on 11 November 1998.
- The park surrounding the round tower contains thirteen smaller stone structures:
- There are three pillars giving the killed, wounded and missing of each division

*36th (Ulster) Division – 32,186
*10th (Irish) Division – 9,363
*16th (Irish) Division – 28,398

- An upright tablet listing the counties of Ireland, the names flowing together to suggest the unity of death
- A bronze tablet depicting a plan of the battle area
- Nine stone tablets with prose, poems and letters from Irish servicemen

Spent all night trying to console, aid and remove the wounded. It was ghastly to see them lying there in the cold, cheerless outhouses, on bare stretchers with no blankets to cover their freezing limbs.

— Chaplain Francis Gleeson, Royal Munster Fusiliers

As it was, the Ypres battleground just represented one gigantic slough of despond into which floundered battalions, brigades and divisions of infantry without end to be shot to pieces or drowned, until at last and with immeasurable slaughter we had gained a few miles of liquid mud.

— Charles Miller, 2nd Royal Inniskilling Fusiliers

So here, while the mad guns curse overhead, and tired men sigh, with mud for couch and floor, know that we fools, now with the foolish dead, died not for Flag, nor King, nor Emperor, but for a dream born in a herdsman’s shed, and for the sacred scripture of the poor.

— Tom Kettle, 9th Royal Dublin Fusiliers

In a matter of seconds, a hissing and shrieking pandemonium broke loose. The sky was splashed with light. Rockets, green, yellow and red, darted in all directions; and simultaneously, a cyclone of bursting shells enveloped us.

— JFB O’Sullivan, 6th Connaught Rangers

It is too late now to retrieve a fallen dream, too late to grieve a name unmade, but not too late to thank the Gods for what is great. A keen edged sword, a soldier’s heart is greater than a poet’s art. And greater than a poet’s fame a little grave that has no name.

— Francis Ledwidge, 5th Inniskilling Fusiliers

I wish the sea were not so wide that parts me from my love, I wish that things men do below were known to God above. I wish that I were back again in the Glens of Donegal; they’ll call me coward if I return, but a hero if I fall.

— Patrick MacGill, London Irish Rifles

Hostilities will cease at 11.00am on the 11th day of the 11th month. After that time all firing will cease. This was joyous news. Approaching eleven o'clock in our sector you could have heard a pin drop. When eleven o'clock came there were loud cheers. The war was over as far as we were concerned.

— Terence Poulter, 7th Royal Dublin Fusiliers

So the curtain fell, over that tortured country of unmarked graves and unburied fragments of men: Murder and massacre: The innocent slaughtered for the guilty: The poor man for the sake of the rich: The man of no authority made the victim of the man who had gathered importance and wished to keep it.

— David Starret, 9th Royal Irish Rifles

I mean the simple soldier man, who when the Great War first began, just died, stone dead from lumps of lead, in mire.

— William Orpen, Official War Artist

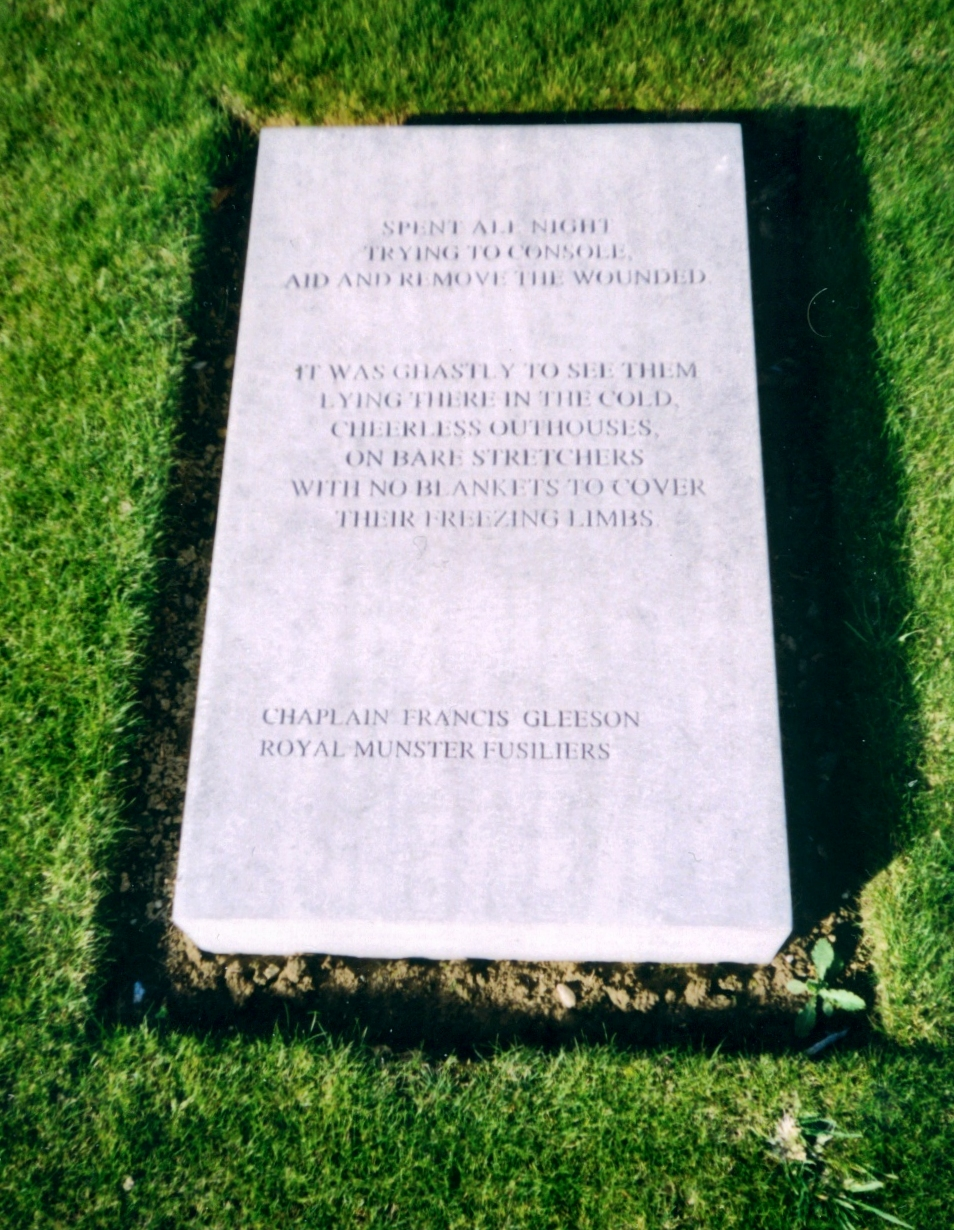
Chaplain Francis Gleeson's letter home from the front. Chaplain Gleeson served with the Royal Munster Fusiliers.

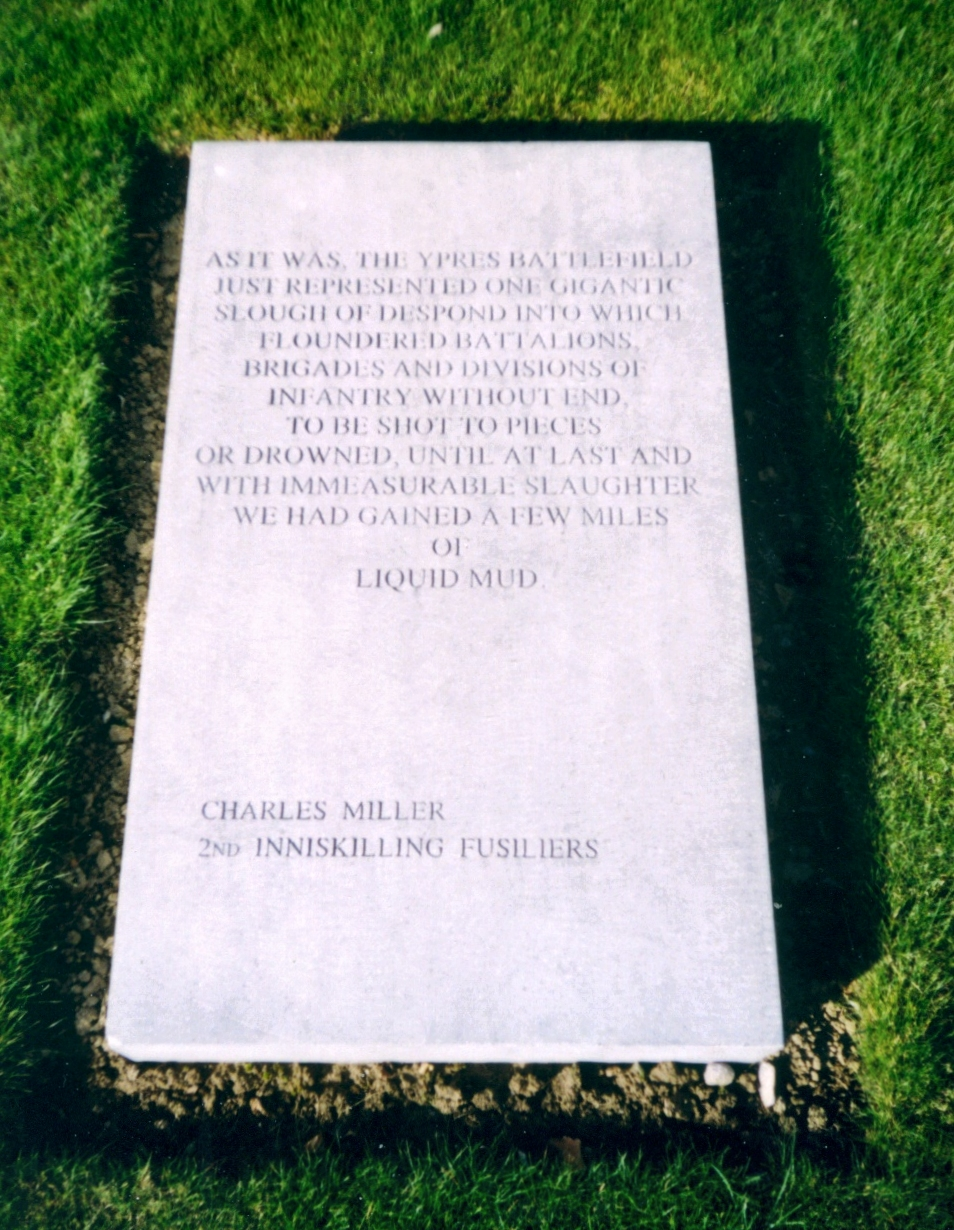
Charles Miller's letter home from the front. Charles Miller served in the 2nd Inniskilling Fusiliers.

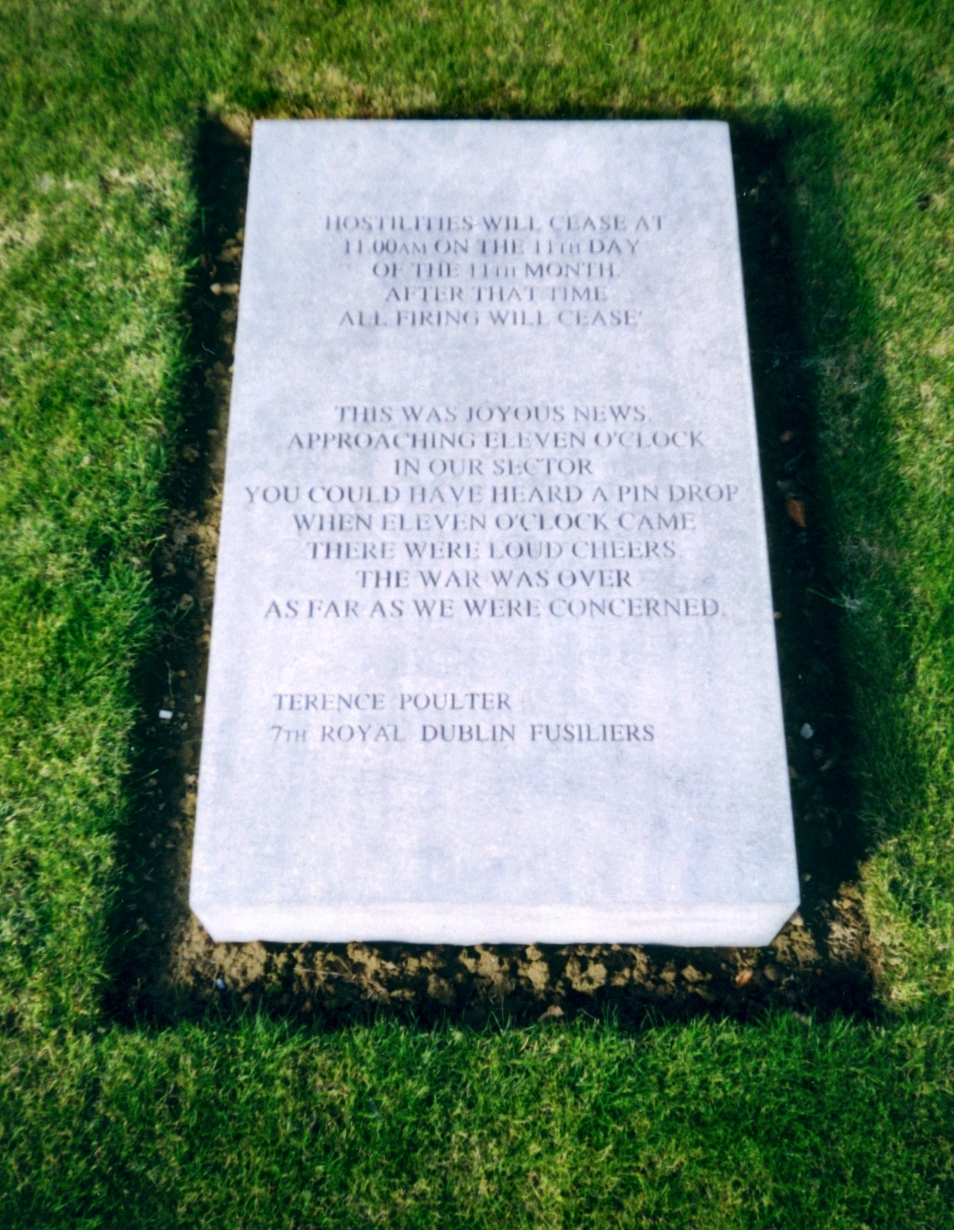
Terence Poulter's letter home from the front. Terence Poulter served in the 7th Royal Dublin Fusiliers.

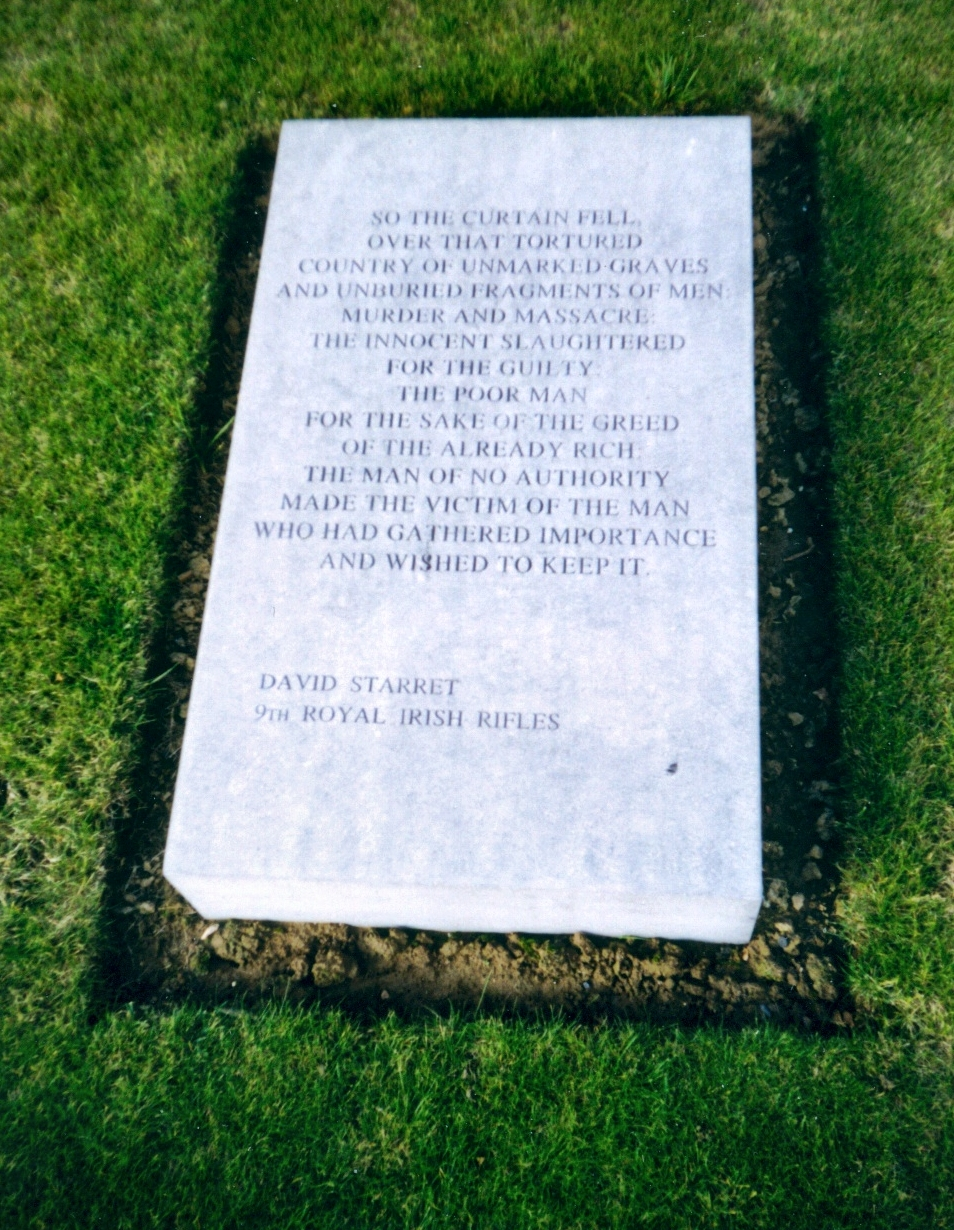
David Starret's letter home from the front. David Starret served in the 9th Royal Irish Rifles.

== Messines Peace Village ==
The completion of the Peace Park ultimately led to the development and construction of the Messines Peace Village, an international rural hostel equipped for seminars and meetings, ideal for associations, companies, youth and school groups.

The first stone was placed on 7 June 2005 by Taoiseach na hÉireann (Prime Minister of Ireland) Bertie Ahern in the presence of the Burgomaster of Messines, Sandy Evrard and the Flemish Minister of Administrative Affairs, Foreign Policy, Media and Tourism, Geert Bourgeois.

Only one year later, the Peace Village was officially opened. The inauguration took place on 7 June 2006 by the Irish Minister of Foreign Affairs, Dermot Ahern, the British Minister for Northern Ireland, David Hanson, Geert Bourgeois and Sandy Evrard.

== See also ==
- Irish National War Memorial Gardens, Dublin, Ireland
- Peace Park, Dublin, Ireland
- Menin Gate Memorial, Ypres, West Flanders, Belgium
- Ulster Tower Memorial, Thiepval, France.
