= Helen's Tower =

19th-century folly in Northern Ireland

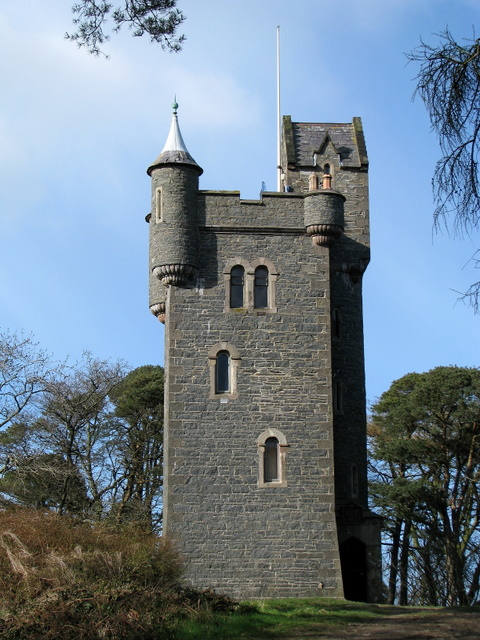
- Helen's Tower in 2008, seen from the south

- Location in Northern Ireland
- 54.62277°N 5.69469°W

History
- Built: 1848–1861

Site notes
- Architect: William Burn

Listed Building – Grade A
- Designated: 06/01/1975
- Reference no.: HB23/06/009

Helen's Tower is a 19th-century folly and lookout tower in Conlig, County Down, Northern Ireland. It was built by 5th Lord Dufferin and Clandeboye and named for his mother, Helen. He intended it as a shrine for poems, first of all a poem by his mother and then others that he solicited from famous poets over the years. Tennyson's Helen's Tower is the best known of them. The tower is an example of Scottish Baronial architecture. Helen's Tower inspired the design of the Ulster Tower, a war memorial at Thiepval, France.

== Location ==
Helen's Tower stands on the top of a wooded hill between Bangor and Newtownards, County Down, Northern Ireland. This hill rises to a height of about 130 metres (430 ft) above mean sea level and forms the highest point of the Clandeboye Estate, a large park surrounding Clandeboye House, the great house of the Barons and Marquesses of Dufferin. A similar but higher landmark, Scrabo Tower, built by the Londonderrys, stands on the next hill to the south. The Clandeboye Estate lies 11 miles (18 km) east of Belfast on the outskirts of Bangor near the southern shore of Belfast Lough.

== History ==
Frederick Temple Blackwood became the 5th Lord Dufferin and Claneboye and inherited the estate at his father's untimely death in 1841, while still a minor. When he came of age in 1847, he decided to surround Ballyleidy House (later called Clandeboye House) with a large English landscape garden. As that year was the worst of the Great Famine, the work might in part have been motivated by the desire to help people affected by offering employment.

Lord Dufferin planted trees and created a lake. He decided to embellish the park with a landmark by building a lookout tower on a hill. For this he engaged William Burn, who was well established as an architect of country houses. The Scottish Baronial style was chosen for the tower. A Scottish style suited the Dufferins, as the family had come to Ireland from Scotland during the Plantation of Ulster. A perspective drawing by Burn, dated 1848, shows Helen's Tower very much as it has been built, only that the caption calls it the gamekeeper's tower. The building's outside was complete by November 1850 when it was formally named Helen's Tower in honour of Dufferin's mother, who was 43 at the time. As she died only in 1867, the tower celebrates rather than commemorates her. The interior decoration was only completed on 23 October 1861. Dufferin intended the tower as a lookout but also as a shrine for a poem that his mother wrote for him on the eve of his 21st birthday. This poem is inscribed on a metal plate in the upper room surrounded by other poems as will be explained further down.

In 1975 Helen's Tower was listed as a Grade A historic building After a period of neglect, it was restored in the 1980s and was available to rent as holiday accommodation from the Irish Landmark Trust.

== Architecture ==
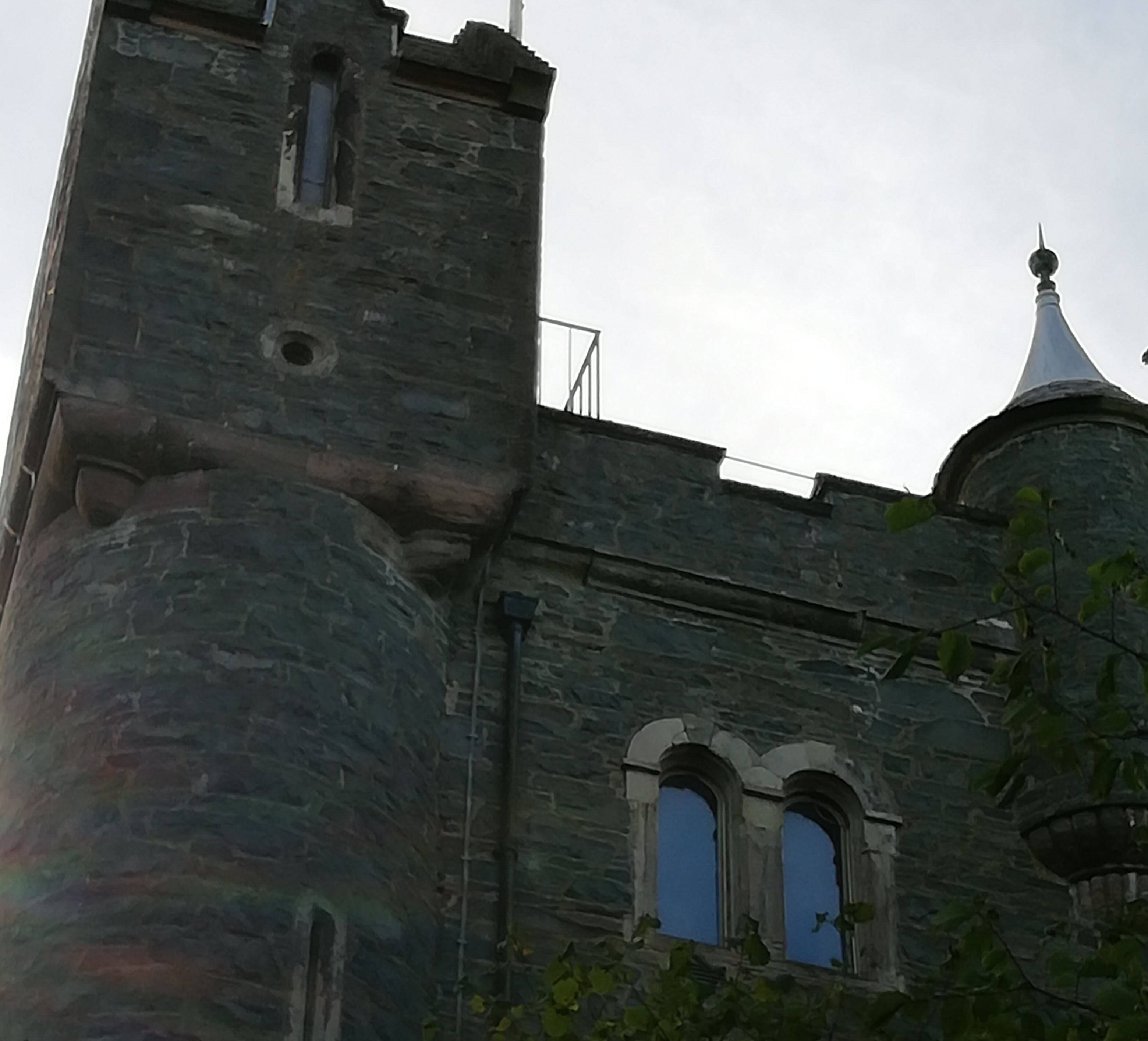
Top of the northern facade with the cap-house over the stair tower.

The tower's style is Scottish Baronial Revival. It seems to be the earliest of William Burn's designs in this style. Its height is 60 feet (18 m) as was measured on the scaled elevation drawing in Howley (1993). The tower consists of a base, a main body, and a flat turreted roof. The base, which contains the ground floor, has battered outer surfaces that pass without break into the vertical walls of the tower's main body. The base and the main body are square in plan and comprise a round stair tower that projects from the northeastern corner. The tower's flat turreted roof, or roof-bastion, forms a viewing platform that is surrounded by four corbelled corner turrets linked by parapets. The parapets on the southern, western and northern sides are each incised by one central crenel. The two western turrets are round and proportioned like pepperpots. They have steep concave conical roofs, covered with slate at the bottom, capped with lead at the top, and crowned with ball finials. The southeastern turret serves as chimney stack. It is round and low and carries four ceramic chimney pots. The corbels of these three turrets are roll-moulded and patterned. The northeastern turret is bigger than the others and takes the form of a square garret chamber. Its outer corners are corbelled out over the cylindric stair tower. The chamber has a slate saddle roof with an east-west trending ridge that ends in crow-stepped gables, which form the highest points of the turret and indeed the whole tower. Small gabled wall dormer windows break the mids of the turret's eaves, one on the northern and one on the southern side. The garret chamber serves as cap-house, giving access from the spiral stairs to the viewing platform by way of a small descending outer stair.

The design of the stair tower and cap-house evokes the square-corbelled-on-round towers of the original Scottish Baronial style (16th and 17th century, e.g. at Claypotts Castle) that Burn miniaturised somewhat for use at Helen's Tower.

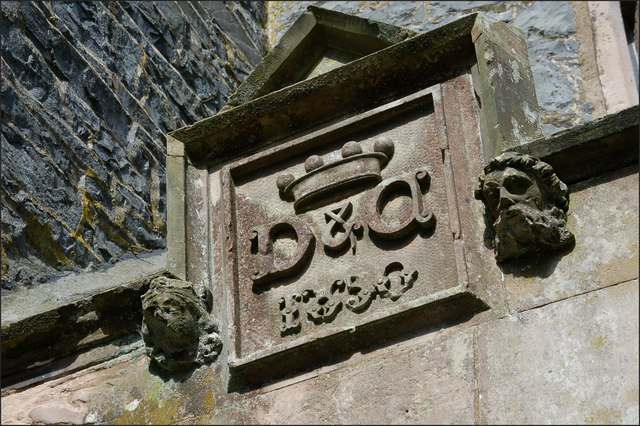
The datestone above the entrance to Helen's Tower in 2007.

The entrance to Helen's Tower is in a porch that occupies the re-entrant between the base of the square tower and that of the stair tower on the eastern side. The porch has a hipped roof built of lapped (feathered) sandstone courses. The entrance door opens to the south and is surmounted by a square datestone sheltered by a hood mould. The stone shows a coronet, an aristocratic cypher ("monogram") and the year 1850. The coronet has four balls as befits a baron. The cypher shows two opposed uppercase Ds and an ampersand between them (D & Ɑ). A similar device appears on the gable of Helen's Bay railway station (1863) where however the two Ds are interlaced to form a proper monogram rather than a cypher. The description of Helen's Tower on the historic building list says the cypher is short for Dufferin and Ava, interpreting the second D as a lowercase A. However, this cannot be as the coronet is a baron's and the year is 1850, whereas the marquessate of Dufferin and Ava would only be created in 1888. The Dufferin Memorial Hall in Bangor, built in 1905, shows a very different DA monogram for Dufferin & Ava.

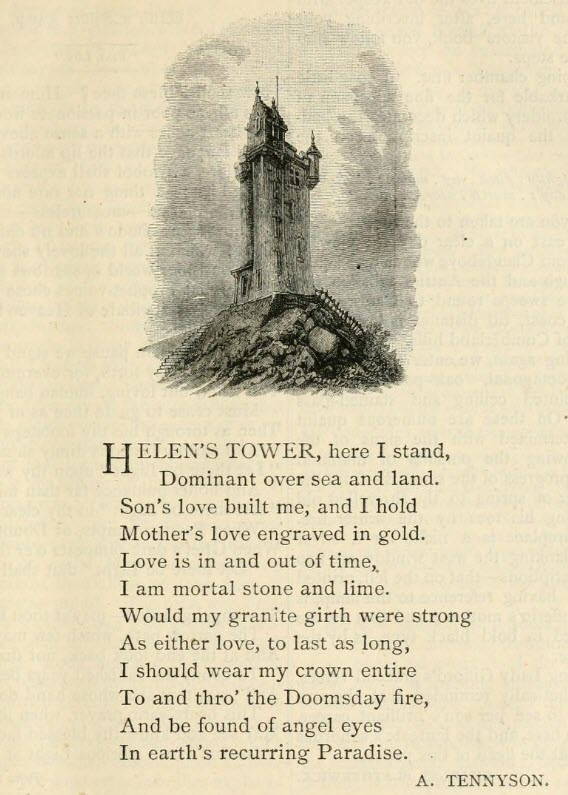
Tennyson's poem as published in Good Words in 1884, illustrated with a picture of Helen's Tower

The walls of the tower are built of a dark massive stone, called "blackstone", laid in rubble courses. The outer surfaces of the blocks were left in low-relief rough rustication. This stone seems to be mostly the local Ordovician-Silurian greywacke that outcrops on the hill's slopes around the tower with perhaps some dolerite (also called basalt). The quoins are hewn out of a different stone that is lighter in colour. It is massive like a granite but has a finer grain and lacks recognisable feldspar, quartz and mica. The true nature of the "granite" has not been established. The tower's projected plinth course is made of this same material. This "granite" is not mentioned in the Listed Buildings Details. The tower's window dressings, corbels and coping are made of whitish or pinkish cross-stratified sandstone. This is also the material of the porch. This sandstone came from the quarries of nearby Scrabo Hill.

The interior of the tower was probably designed by Benjamin Ferrey, who built Helen's Bay railway station. The upper room, also called the library, is octagonal and occupies the third floor directly under the roof platform. It is decorated in a Gothic style. Its walls are oak-panelled and it has an ornate wooden ceiling imitating a ribbed groin vault. The centre of that ceiling is occupied by a pendant in wooden Gothic tracery. The sitting-room on the second floor has a coffered ceiling, the panels of which are filled with painted roundels formed by circular inscriptions enclosing coronets or crests.

== Poems ==
Helen's Tower, here I stand,
Dominant over sea and land.
Son's love built me, and I hold
Mother's love in lettered gold.
Love is in and out of time,
I am mortal stone and lime.
Would my granite girth were strong
As either love, to last as long
I should wear my crown entire
To and thro' the Doomsday fire,
And be found of angel eyes
In earth's recurring Paradise.

— [As inscribed on the plate]

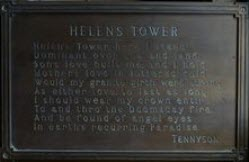
Plate with Tennyson's poem in the upper room of Helen's Tower

Dufferin's mother, Helen, Lady Dufferin, née Sheridan, was a noted songwriter and playwright in her time. Her sister Caroline Norton also was a successful writer, and their grandfather was Richard Brinsley Sheridan (1751–1816), playwright, poet and owner of London's Drury Lane theatre. To please his mother, Dufferin asked several poets to write poems about her and the tower. Alfred, Lord Tennyson, Robert Browning, Thomas Carlyle, Sir Edwin Arnold, Rudyard Kipling, Richard Garnett, Wilfrid Scawen Blunt, and Lord Houghton contributed.

The best known of these poems is Lord Tennyson's Helen's Tower. Lord Dufferin persuaded Tennyson to write it in 1861. The poem is known in several versions. The text given in the present article (framed) is the one displayed on a metal plate in the tower. Slightly different versions were published in 1884 in the Good Words magazine and in 1885 in Tiresias and Other Poems.

Many of these poems were published in the privately printed Book of Helen's Tower. Some were engraved on metallic plates displayed in the tower's upper room. This includes Tennyson's and Houghton's poem, as well as the poem called To My Dear Son, written by Dufferin's mother.

== Ulster Tower ==
During the First World War, the 36th (Ulster) Division was created as part of Kitchener's New Army. It was formed mainly from members of the Ulster Volunteer Force. Parts of the division trained at Clandeboye before being sent to the front to fight in the Battle of the Somme. A close replica of Helen's Tower, the Ulster Tower, was built at Thiepval, Somme Department, France, in 1921 as a memorial to the men of the 36th Division who fell in the battle.

== Sources ==
- Batchelor, John (2014). Tennyson, To Strive, to Seek, to Find. London: Vintage Books. ISBN 978-1845950767.
- Blatherwick, Charles (1884). "Helen's Tower". Good Words. 25.
- Brett, Charles Edward Bainbridge (2002). Buildings of North County Down. Belfast: Ulster Architectural Heritage Society. ISBN 978-0900457579.
- Department for Communities. "Historic Building Details – HB Ref No: HB23/06/009". Buildings.
- Howley, James (1993). The Follies and Garden Buildings of Ireland. New Haven, Connecticut: Yale University Press. ISBN 0-300-10225-9.
- Irish Landmark Trust. "Properties – Helen's Tower". Irish Landmark Trust.
- Nicolson, Harold (1937). Helen's Tower. London: Constable & Co. Ltd.
- Patton, Marcus (1999). Bangor – An Historical Gazetteer. Belfast: Ulster Architectural Heritage Society. ISBN 9780900457524. – No preview in Google Books
- Stamp, Gavin (1985). Clandeboye. Belfast: Ulster Architectural Heritage Society.
- Tennyson, Alfred (1885). Tiresias And Other Poems. London: MacMillan & Co.
