= Albert Leigh Abbott =

British architect

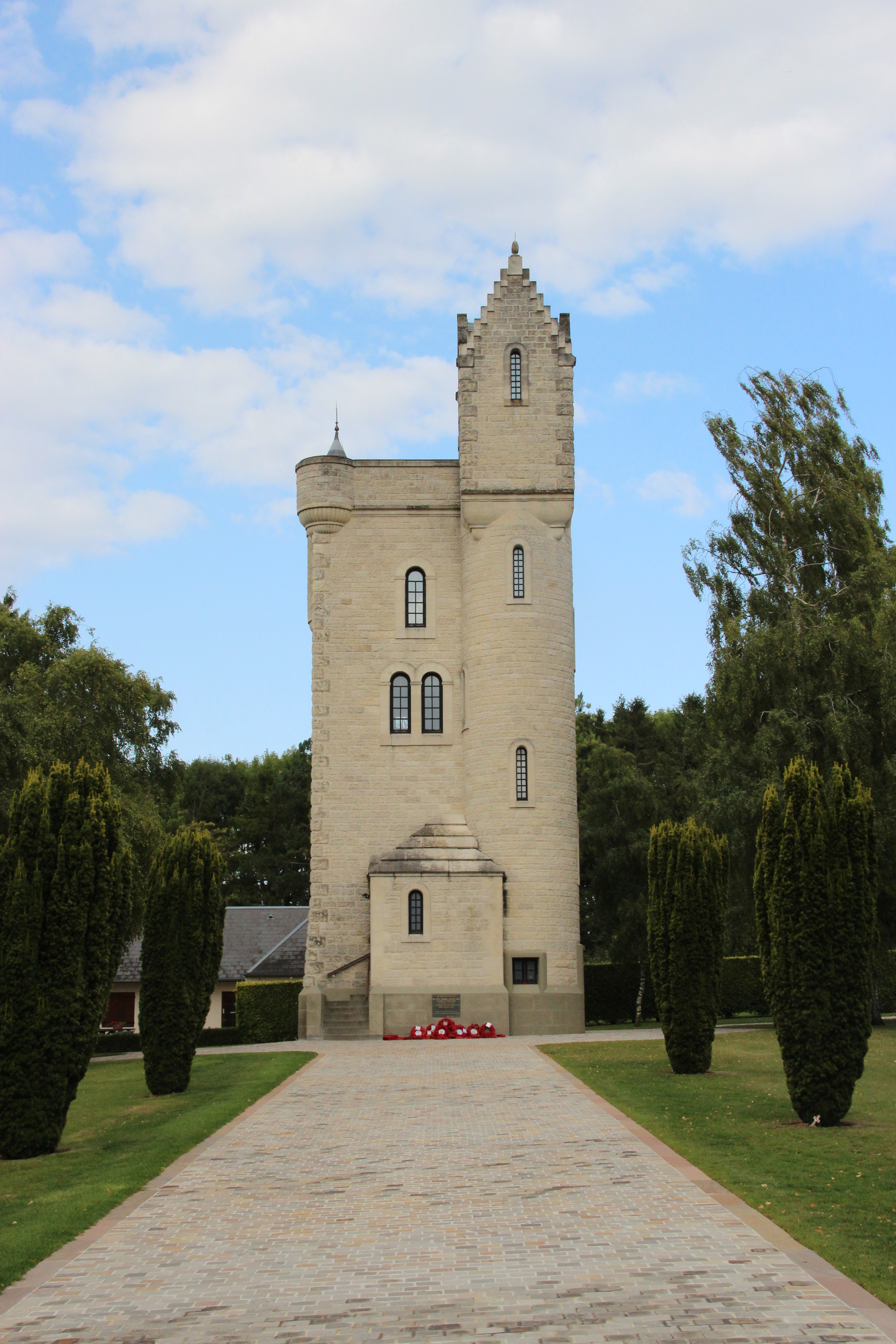
Memorial at Thiepval to the 36th Ulster Division

Lieutenant Colonel Albert Leigh Abbott MC TD FRIBA (1890 – 1952) was an architect based in London.

== Architectural career ==
He won a travelling studentship in 1913.

He was Inspector of Housing for the Ministry of Health from 1920-21. He worked for local authorities in the construction of council houses and also designed many large houses for individual clients.

He was appointed LRIBA in 1925 and FRIBA in 1931.

He entered into a partnership with Y.J. Lovell and Son and Douglas Tanner as Lovell, Abbott and Tanner.

Later he set up new partnership of A.L. Abbott & Partners (William Beswick and Geoffrey Richard Shires) and this was dissolved on 1 November 1952 shortly before his death.

== Personal life ==
He was born in 1890 in Hendon, London, the son of John Abbott (1852-1932) and Emma Rowe (1852 - 1923).

He married Alice Elizabeth Hudson (1893-1981) on 5 January 1918 in St Margaret's Church, Westminster. They had three children.

- Denis Leigh Abbott (1920 - 2013)
- Capt. Anthony Cecil Abbott (1921 - 1992)
- Mona Abbott (1931 - 2010)

He died on 13 December 1952 at his home at 15 College Road, West Dulwich when his car caught fire in his garage.

== Military career ==
In the First World War he served as a Corporal in the London Regiment and on 21 August 1915 he was commissioned into the London Divisional Engineers before later being transferred to the Corps of Royal Engineers in the Territorial Army where he was awarded the Military Cross in 1918.

He reached the rank of Major in 1920 which was confirmed in 1926. and in 1933 he was promoted from Major to Lieutenant Colonel.

== Works ==
- Memorial at Thiepval to the 36th Ulster Division (with J.A. Bowden) 1921
- Nexdaw (now Chiltern House), 34 Orchehill Avenue, Gerrards Cross 1922
- The Heath, Leighton Buzzard 1924 (reconstruction)
- Semi-detached houses, 52-54 Hartswood Road, Hammersmith 1927
- 84 Widmore Road, Bromley 1933
- Crown Cork Company Apexes Works, Scott’s Road, Southall 1933 (extension)
- Tremar, Green Lane, Stanmore 1935
- The Bumbles, 8 Woodhill Avenue, Gerrards Cross 1935
- Olde Tyles, 22 Camp Road, Gerrards Cross 1936
- German Embassy, 9 Carlton House terrace, London 1937 (reconstruction)
- The Australian Pavilion, Empire Exhibition, Bellahouston Park, Glasgow 1938
- Factory for High Duty Alloys Ltd, Distington, Cumberland 1940.
