= 36th (Ulster) Division =

WWI British infantry division

- Active: September 1914 – January 1919
- Country: United Kingdom of Great Britain and Ireland
- Branch: British Army
- Type: Infantry
- Size: Division
- Engagements: World War I Battle of the Somme Battle of Cambrai (1917) Battle of Messines (1917) Battle of Passchendaele Battle of the Lys (1918) Battle of Courtrai (1918)

Commanders
- Notable commanders: Sir Oliver Nugent

The 36th (Ulster) Division was an infantry division of the British Army, part of Lord Kitchener's New Army, formed in September 1914. Originally called the Ulster Division, it was made up of mainly members of the Ulster Volunteers, who formed thirteen additional battalions for three existing regiments: the Royal Irish Fusiliers, the Royal Irish Rifles and the Royal Inniskilling Fusiliers. The division served from October 1915 on the Western Front as a formation of the British Army during the Great War.

The division's insignia was the Red Hand of Ulster.

== History ==
=== Formation ===
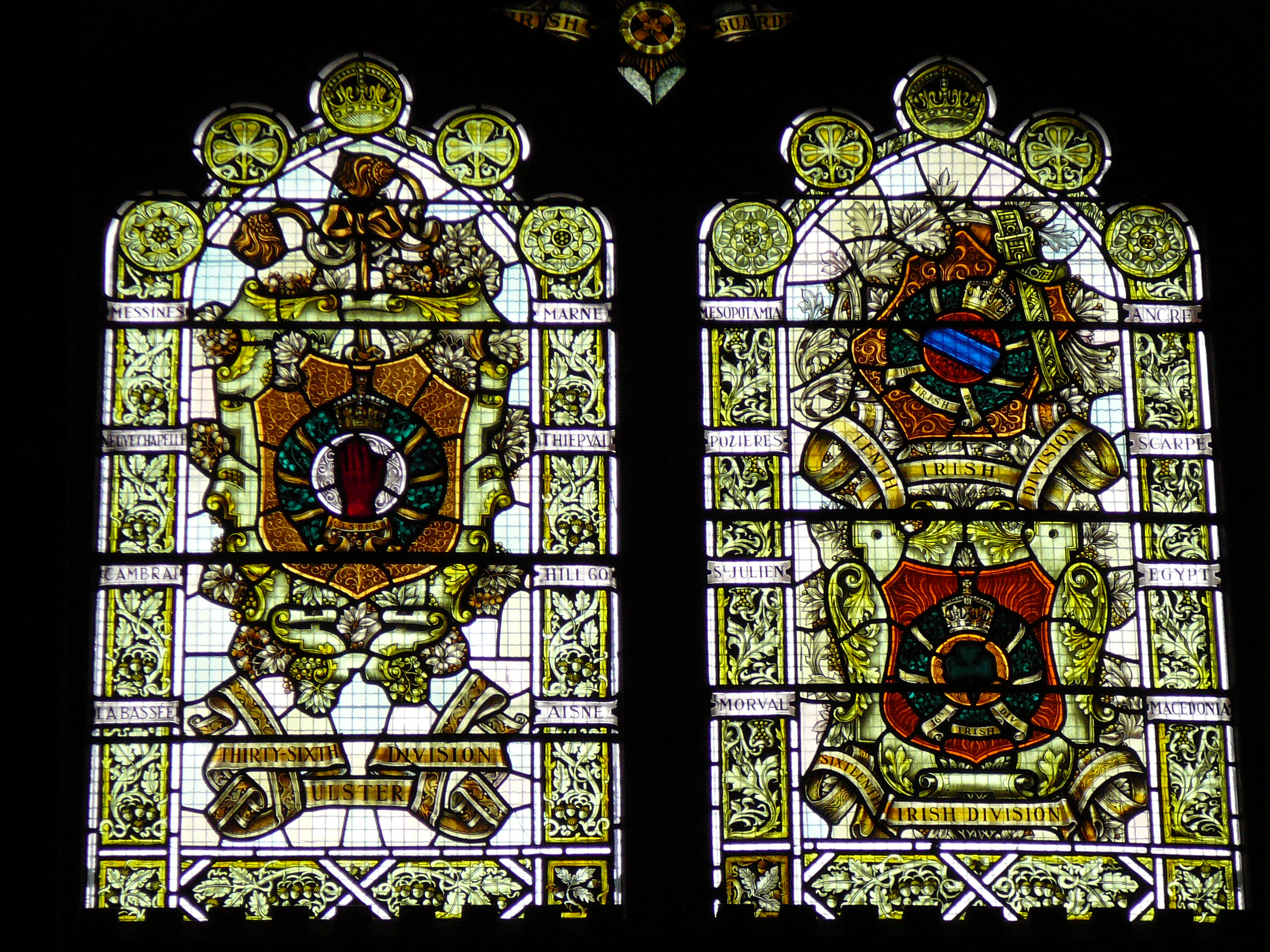
Window in Derry Guildhall commemorating the three Irish divisions which served in the Great War

The Ulster Volunteers were a unionist militia founded in 1912 to block Home Rule for Ireland. In 1913 they organised themselves into the Ulster Volunteer Force to give armed resistance to the prospective Third Home Rule Act (enacted in 1914). Many Ulster Protestants feared being governed by a Catholic-dominated parliament in Dublin and losing their local supremacy and strong links with Britain. At the outbreak of the Great War, Sir Edward Carson, one of the unionist leaders, made an appeal to Ulster Volunteers to come forward for military service. Kitchener had hoped for a brigade's worth of men, but instead received a division, equivalent to three brigades. Major-General Oliver Nugent took command of the division in September 1915 and it moved to France in October 1915.

=== Engagements ===
==== The Somme, 1916 ====
The Ulster Division was one of the few divisions on the British left flank (VII, VIII and X Corps) to make significant gains on the first day on the Somme. It attacked between the Ancre river and Thiepval against a position known as the Schwaben Redoubt. According to military historian Martin Middlebrook:

The leading battalions [of the Ulster Division] had been ordered out from the wood just before 7.30am and laid down near the German trenches [...] At zero hour the British barrage lifted. Bugles blew the "Advance". Up sprang the Ulstermen and, without forming up in the waves adopted by other divisions, they rushed the German front line [...] By a combination of sensible tactics and Ulster dash, the prize that eluded so many, the capture of a long section of the German front line, had been accomplished.

During the Battle of the Somme the Ulster Division was the only division of X Corps to have achieved its objectives on the opening day of the battle. This came at a heavy price, with the division suffering in two days of fighting 5,500 officers and enlisted men killed, wounded or missing. War correspondent Philip Gibbs said of the Division, "Their attack was one of the finest displays of human courage in the world.

Of nine Victoria Crosses given to British forces in the battle, four were awarded to Ulster Division soldiers.

===== Actions of the 36th Division =====
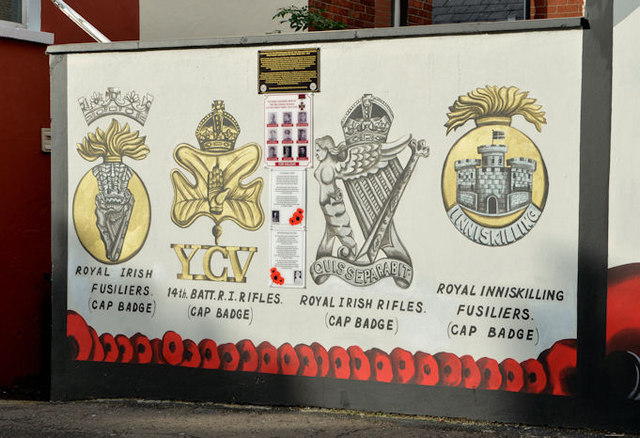
Mural in East Belfast commemorating the various regiments of the division

Thiepval – Somme

The Ulster Division's sector of the Somme lay astride the marshy valley of the River Ancre and the higher ground south of the river. Their task was to cross the ridge and take the German second line near Grandcourt. In their path lay not only the German front line, but just beyond it, the intermediate line within which was the Schwaben Redoubt.

The first day of the Somme was the anniversary (in the Julian calendar) of the Battle of the Boyne, a fact remarked on by the leaders of the division. Stories have often been told that some men wore orange sashes into battle. According to David Hume: "There was many who went over the top at the Somme who were Ulstermen, at least one, Sergeant Samuel Kelly of 9th Inniskillings wearing his Ulster Sash, while others wore orange ribbons". Martin Middlebrook recounts a story that when some of his men wavered, one company commander from the West Belfasts, Major George Gaffikin, took off his orange sash, held it high for his men to see, and roared the traditional war-cry of the Battle of the Boyne: "Come on, boys! No surrender!" However, historians Robin Prior and Trevor Wilson, quoting Northern Irish historian Keith Jeffery, state that such stories are myths.

On 1 July, following the preliminary bombardment, the Ulstermen quickly took the German front line, but intelligence was so poor that, with the rest of the division attacking under creep bombardment (artillery fired in front or over men; they advance as it moves) the Ulstermen would have come under attack from their own bombardment in the German first line.

But they still advanced, moving to the crest so rapidly that the Germans had no time to come up from their dugouts (generally 30–40 feet below ground). In the Schwaben Redoubt, which was also taken, so successful was the advance that by 10:00 some had reached the German second line. But again they came under their own barrage, not due to finish until 10:10. However, this successful penetration had to be given up before nightfall, as it was unmatched by those at its flanks. The Ulstermen were exposed in a narrow salient, open to attack on three sides. They were running out of ammunition and supplies, and a full German counter-attack at 22:00 forced them to withdraw, giving up virtually all they gained.

The division had suffered over 5,000 casualties and 2,069 deaths. The Thiepval Memorial commemorates the 1916 Anglo-French offensive on the Somme and the men who died there, including those from the Ulster Division. It is the biggest British war memorial to the missing of the Western Front, both in physical size and in terms of the numbers it commemorates (more than 73,000). It was built in the late 1920s and early 1930s.

===== Ulster Memorial Tower =====
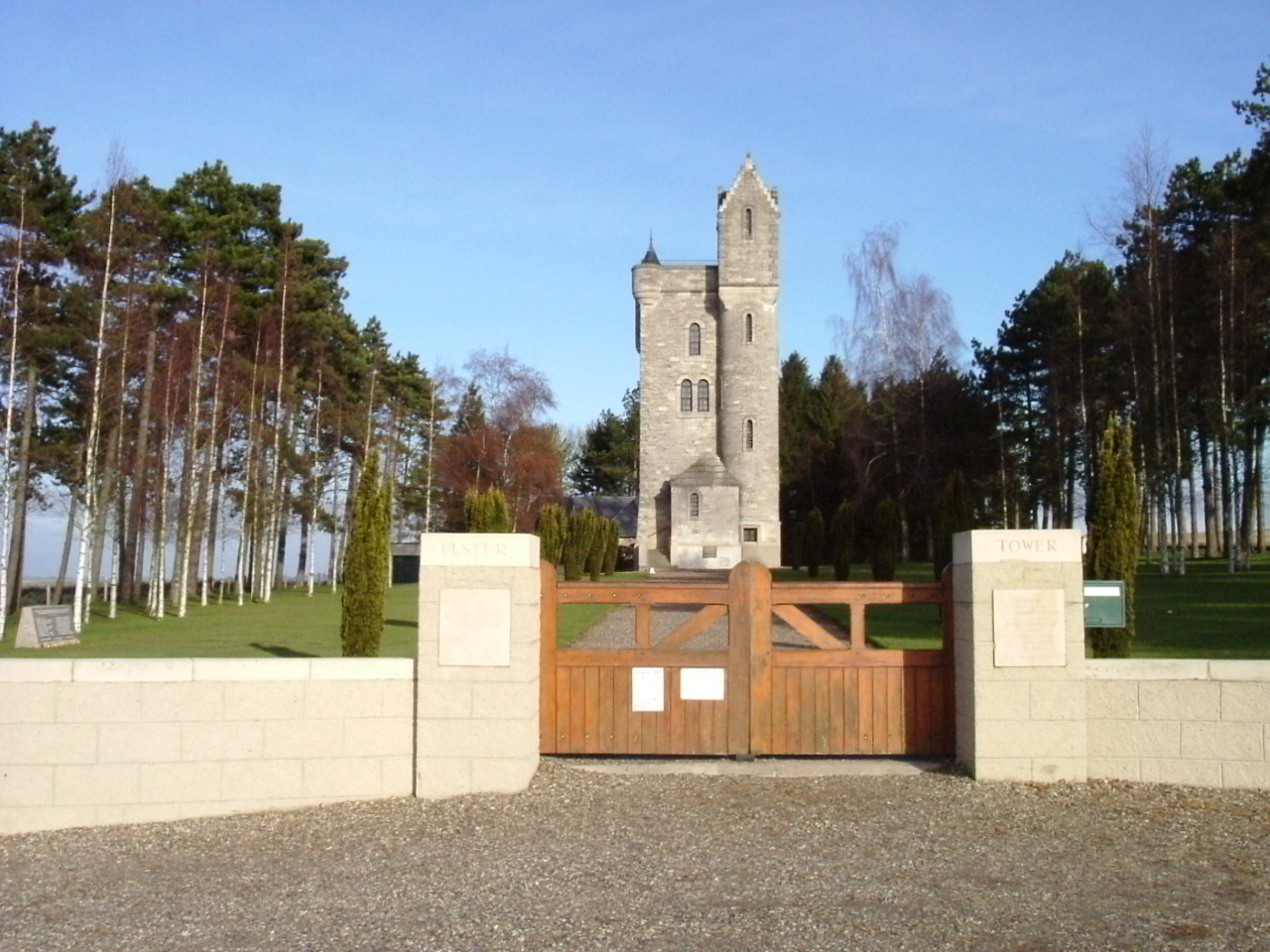
Ulster Tower, Thiepval

The Ulster Memorial Tower was unveiled by Field-Marshal Sir Henry Wilson in Thiepval, France, on 19 November 1921, in commemoration of the contributions of the 36th (Ulster) Division during World War I. The tower marks the site of the Schwaben Redoubt, against which the Ulster Division advanced on the first day of the Somme.

Lord Carson had intended to perform the unveiling himself but, due to illness, Field-Marshal Wilson took his place. The money was raised by public subscription in Northern Ireland in memory of the officers and men of the Ulster Division, and all Ulstermen who died in the great war.

The tower itself is a replica of Helen's Tower at Clandeboye, County Down. It was at Helen's Tower that the men of the then newly formed Ulster Division drilled and trained on the outbreak of World War I. For many of the men of the division, the distinctive sight of Helen's Tower rising above the surrounding countryside was one of their last abiding memories of home before their departure for England and, subsequently, the Western Front.

==== Messines, 1917 ====
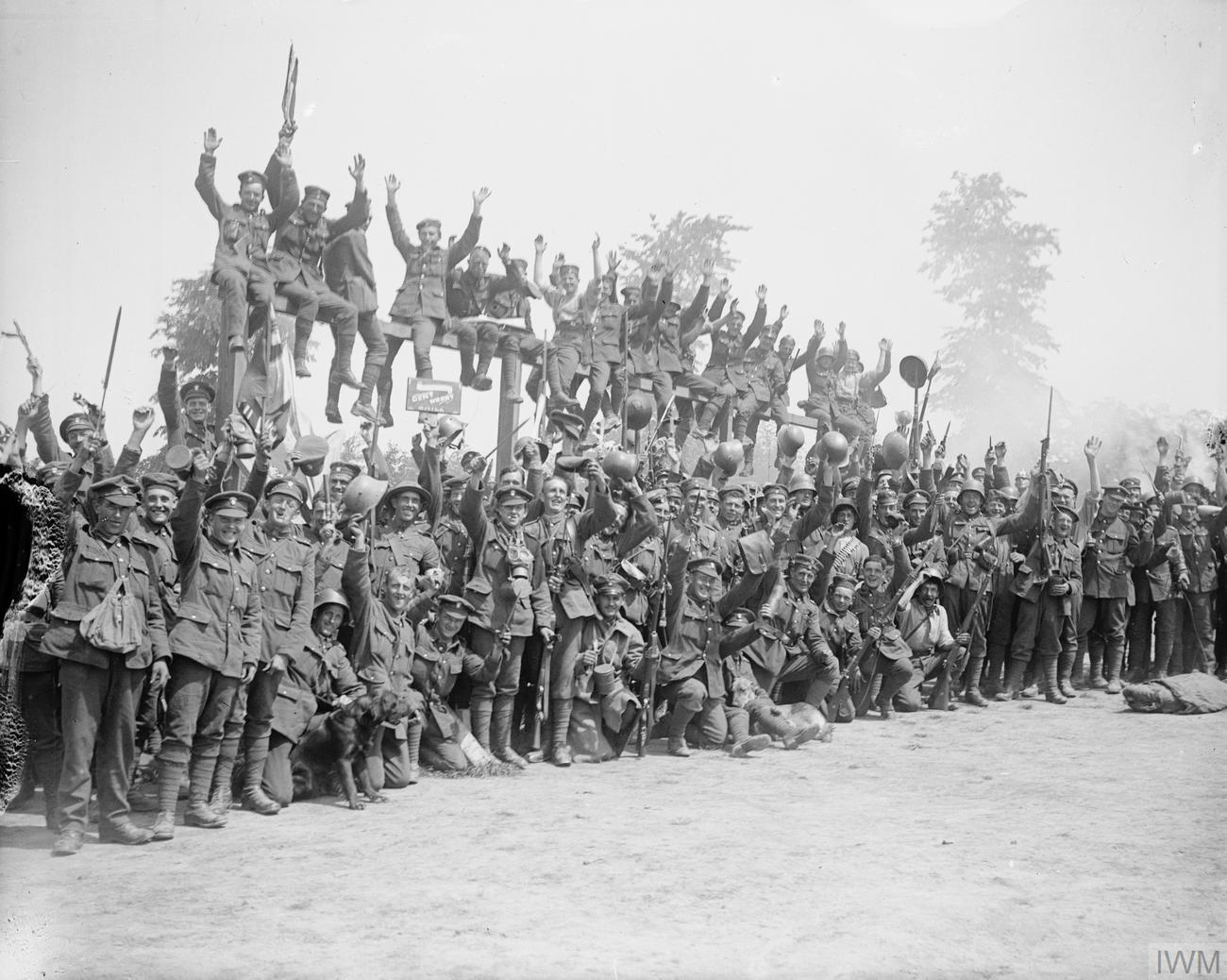
Men of the Inniskillings posing with captured German equipment in the aftermath of the Battle of Messines

The Ulster Division was deeply involved in the fighting around Spanbroekmolen on the first day of the Battle of Messines (7–14 June 1917). Many of its men are buried in Spanbroekmolen British Cemetery and Lone Tree Commonwealth War Graves Commission Cemetery on Messines Ridge.

== Victoria Cross recipients ==
In total, nine members (four from Northern Ireland, four from England and one from the Republic of Ireland) of the Ulster Division were awarded the Victoria Cross:

- Captain Eric Norman Frankland Bell, (born Enniskillen, Ireland) 9th Battalion the Royal Inniskilling Fusiliers. Died 20 years old, 1 July 1916, Battle of the Somme.
- 2nd Lieutenant James Samuel Emerson, (born County Louth, Republic Of Ireland) 9th Battalion the Royal Inniskilling Fusiliers. Died 22 years old, 6 December 1917, La Vacquerie.
- Lance Corporal Ernest Seaman (born Norwich, England) 2nd Battalion the Royal Inniskilling Fusiliers. Died 25 years old, 29 September 1918, Terhand Belgium. He also was awarded the Military Medal.
- Fusilier Norman Harvey, (born Willows, Lancashire, England) 1st Battalion the Royal Inniskilling Fusiliers. Awarded for actions during 25 October 1918, Ingoyghem, Belgium.
- Second Lieutenant Edmund De Wind, (born Comber, Northern Ireland) 15th Battalion the Royal Irish Rifles. Died 34 years old, 21 March 1918, Second Battle of the Somme.
- Rifleman William Frederick McFadzean, (born Lurgan, Armagh, Northern Ireland) 14th Battalion the Royal Irish Rifles. Died 20 years old, 1 July 1916, Battle of the Somme.
- Rifleman Robert Quigg, (born Ardhannon, Antrim Ireland) 12th Battalion the Royal Irish Rifles. Awarded for actions during the Battle of the Somme on 1 July 1916. Also awarded the Medal of the Order of St George (Fourth Class), the highest honour of the Russian Empire.
- Lieutenant Geoffrey Cather, (born Streatham, London, England) 9th Battalion the Royal Irish Fusiliers. Died 25 years old, 2 July 1916, Battle of the Somme.
- Cecil Leonard Knox, (born Nuneaton, England) 150th Field Company Royal Engineers. Awarded 22 March 1918 at Tugny-et-Pont, Aisne.

== Commendations ==
After the first day on the Somme, Captain Wilfred Spender of the Ulster Division's HQ staff was quoted in the press as saying:

I am not an Ulsterman, but yesterday as I followed their amazing attack I felt that I would rather be an Ulsterman than anything else in the world [...] My pen cannot describe adequately the hundreds of heroic acts that I witnessed [...] The Ulster Division has lost more than half the men who attacked, and in doing so has sacrificed itself for the Empire which has treated them none too well. The much derided Ulster Volunteer Force has won a name which equals any in History. Their devotion, which no doubt has helped the advance elsewhere, deserves the gratitude of the British Empire. It is due to the memory of these brave heroes that their beloved Province shall be fairly treated.

After the war, King George V paid tribute to the 36th Division, saying:

In these days of rejoicing I recall the deeds of the 36th (Ulster) Division, which have more than fulfilled the high opinion formed by me on inspecting that force on the eve of its departure for the front. Throughout the long years of struggle, which have now so gloriously ended, the men of Ulster have proved how nobly they fight and die.

Winston Churchill

The record of the Thirty-Sixth Division will ever be the pride of Ulster. At Thiepval in the battle of the Somme on 1 July 1916; at Wytschaete on 17 June 1917, in the storming of the Messines Ridge; on the Canal du Nord, in the attack on the Hindenburg Line of 20 November the same year; on 21 March 1918, near Fontaine-les-Clercs, defending their positions long after they were isolated and surrounded by the enemy; and later in the month at Andechy in the days of "backs to the wall", they acquired a reputation for conduct and devotion deathless in military history of the United Kingdom, and repeatedly signalised in the despatches of the Commander-in-Chief.

John Buchan

North of Thiepval the Ulster Division broke through the enemy trenches, passed the crest of the ridge, and reached the point called The Crucifix, in rear of the first German position. For a little they held the strong Schwaben Redoubt, which we were not to enter again till after three months of battle, and some even got into the outskirts of Grandcourt. It was the anniversary day of the Battle of the Boyne, and that charge when the men shouted "Remember the Boyne," will be for ever a glorious page in the annals of Ulster. The splendid troops, drawn from those volunteers who had banded themselves together to defend their own freedom, now shed their blood like water for the liberty of the world.

== Order of battle ==
The following units served with the division:

107th Brigade

- 8th (Service) Battalion (East Belfast), the Royal Irish Rifles
- 9th (Service) Battalion (West Belfast), the Royal Irish Rifles
- Both of the above will amalgamate in September 1917 to form 8/9th Battalion the Royal Irish Rifles
- 10th (Service) Battalion (South Belfast), the Royal Irish Rifles (until February 1918)
- 15th (Service) Battalion (North Belfast), the Royal Irish Rifles
- 1st Battalion, the Royal Irish Fusiliers (from August 1917 until February 1918)
- 1st Battalion, the Royal Irish Rifles (from February 1918)
- 2nd Battalion, the Royal Irish Rifles (from February 1918)
- 107th Brigade Machine Gun Company (from 18 December 1915, moved into 36 MG Bn 1 March 1918)
- 107th Trench Mortar Battery (from 1 April 1916)

Between 6 November 1915 and 7 February 1916 the brigade swapped with the 12th Brigade from the 4th Division.

108th Brigade

- 9th (Service) Battalion, the Royal Irish Fusiliers
- 12th (Service) Battalion (Central Antrim), the Royal Irish Rifles
- 2nd Battalion, the Royal Irish Rifles (from November 1917 to 107th Bde. February 1918)
- 11th (Service) Battalion (South Antrim), the Royal Irish Rifles
- 13th (Service) Battalion (County Down), the Royal Irish Rifles
- Both of the above will amalgamate and become the 11/13th Battalion the Royal Irish Rifles in November 1917 (disbanded February 1918)
- 7th Battalion the Royal Irish Rifles (14 October - 14 November 1917- 14 October 1917 Absorbed into 2nd Battalion Royal Irish Rifles)
- 1st Battalion, the Royal Irish Fusiliers (from 107th Bde. February 1918)
- 108th Brigade Machine Gun Company (from 26 January 1916, moved into 36 MG Bn 1 March 1918)
- 108th Trench Mortar Battery (from 1 April 1916)

In August 1917 the 11th and 13th battalions of the Royal Irish Rifles amalgamated to form the 11/13th Battalion, which disbanded in February 1918.

109th Brigade

- 9th (Service) Battalion (County Tyrone), the Royal Inniskilling Fusiliers
- 10th (Service) Battalion (County Londonderry), the Royal Inniskilling Fusiliers (disbanded January 1918)
- 11th (Service) Battalion (Donegal and Fermanagh), the Royal Inniskilling Fusiliers (disbanded February 1918)
- 14th (Service) Battalion (Young Citizens), the Royal Irish Rifles (disbanded February 1918)
- 1st Battalion, the Royal Inniskilling Fusiliers (from February 1918)
- 2nd Battalion, the Royal Inniskilling Fusiliers (from February 1918) ll
- 109th Brigade Machine Gun Company (from 23 January 1916, moved into 36 MG Bn 1 March 1918)
- 109th Trench Mortar Battery (from 1 April 1916).

== Battles ==
- Battle of Somme 1916 or Battle of Albert
- Battle of Messines (1917)
- Battle of Langemarck or Third Battle of Ypres
- Battle of Cambrai
- Battle of Saint Quentin
- Battle of Rossiers
- Battle of Lys
- Battle of Kemmel
- Battle of Messines 1918
- Battle of Bailleul
- Battle of Courtrai (1918)

== Commanders ==
- 1914–1915 Major-General C. H. Powell
- 1915 – 6 May 1918 Major-General Oliver Nugent
- 6 May 1918 – Disbandment Major-General Clifford Coffin

== Great War memorials ==
- Ulster Tower, Thiepval, France.
- Irish National War Memorial Gardens, Dublin
- Island of Ireland Peace Park, Messines, Belgium.
- Menin Gate Memorial, Ypres, Belgium.

== See also ==
- List of British divisions in World War I
- 10th (Irish) Division
- 16th (Irish) Division
- Observe the Sons of Ulster Marching Towards the Somme
