= Terhand =

Village in Belgium

Coordinates: 50°50′24″N 3°3′35″E

Terhand is a tiny hamlet approximately 12 km east of Ypres in Belgium.

The village consists of about 40 houses with a small street running through the middle of them. The road from Ypres is lined with fields but very few trees; most of them were destroyed in the First World War. Terhand was captured by the British Army on 29 September, 1918.
