= Ulster Tower =

Northern Ireland's national war memorial

The Ulster Tower Thiepval
- Commonwealth
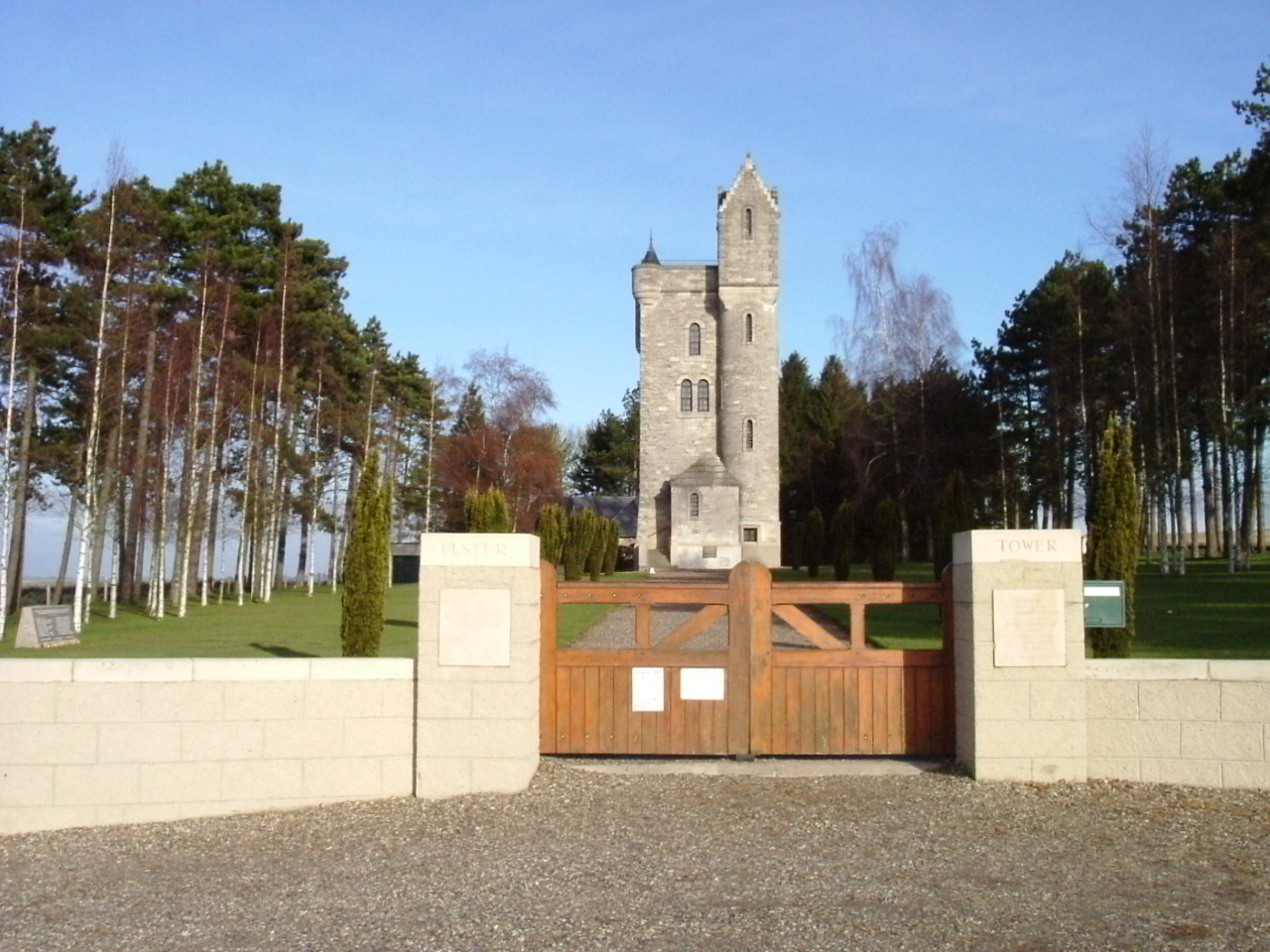
- The Ulster Tower, Thiepval
- For the men of the British 36th (Ulster) Division
- Location: 50°3′40.5″N 2°40′49.1″E
- "This Tower is Dedicated to the Glory of God in grateful memory of the Officers, Non-Commissioned Officers and Men of the 36th (Ulster) Division and of the Sons of Ulster in other forces who laid down their lives in the Great War, and of all their Comrades-In-Arms who, by Divine Grace, were spared to testify to their glorious deeds.
- Statistics source: Inscription Plaque, Ulster Memorial Tower

The Ulster Tower, located in Thiepval, France, is Northern Ireland's National War Memorial. It was one of the first memorials to be erected on the Western Front and commemorates the men of the 36th (Ulster) Division and all those from Ulster who served in the First World War. The memorial was officially opened on 19 November 1921 and is a very close copy of Helen's Tower which stands in the grounds of the Clandeboye Estate, near Bangor, County Down, Northern Ireland. Many of the men of the Ulster Division trained in the estate before moving to England and then France early in 1916.

The Tower (plus a small cafe nearby) is staffed by members of the Somme Association, which is based in Belfast.

== 1916 Battle ==
The Division attacked the Schwaben Redoubt, which is near the Ulster Tower, on 1 July 1916. The Schwaben Redoubt was a little to the north-east of where the tower stands, and was a triangle of trenches with a frontage of 300 yards, a fearsome strongpoint with commanding views. It is also located close to the Thiepval Memorial to the Missing of the Somme.

The front lines were at the edge of Thiepval Wood which lies to the south-west of the road between the Thiepval Memorial and the Ulster Tower. Troops of the 109th Brigade crossed about 400 yards of no man's land, and kept on going. They entered the Schwaben Redoubt, and advanced on towards Stuff Redoubt, gaining in all around a mile, though not without losses. To their left, the 108th Brigade were successful in advancing near Thiepval, but less so nearer the River Ancre.

The 107th Brigade supported them, but although men of the 36th Division held out for the day the Germans mounted counterattacks, and as their stocks of bombs and ammunition dwindled, many fell back with small parties remaining in the German front lines. The casualties suffered by the 36th Division on 1 July totalled over 5,000.

== Memorial ==
At the entrance to the tower is a plaque commemorating the names of the nine men of the Division who won the Victoria Cross during the Somme. There is also a memorial here commemorating the part played by members of the Orange Order during the battle. The inscription on this memorial reads:

This Memorial is Dedicated to the Men and Women of the Orange Institution Worldwide, who at the call of King and country, left all that was dear to them, endured hardness, faced danger, and finally passed out of the sight of man by the path of duty and self sacrifice, giving up their own lives that others might live in Freedom. Let those who come after see to it that their names be not forgotten.

The memorial tower was designed by architects Albert Leigh Abbott and J. A. Bowden.

== See also ==
- 36th (Ulster) Division
- Island of Ireland Peace Park
- Irish National War Memorial Gardens
