= Thiepval =

- Commune
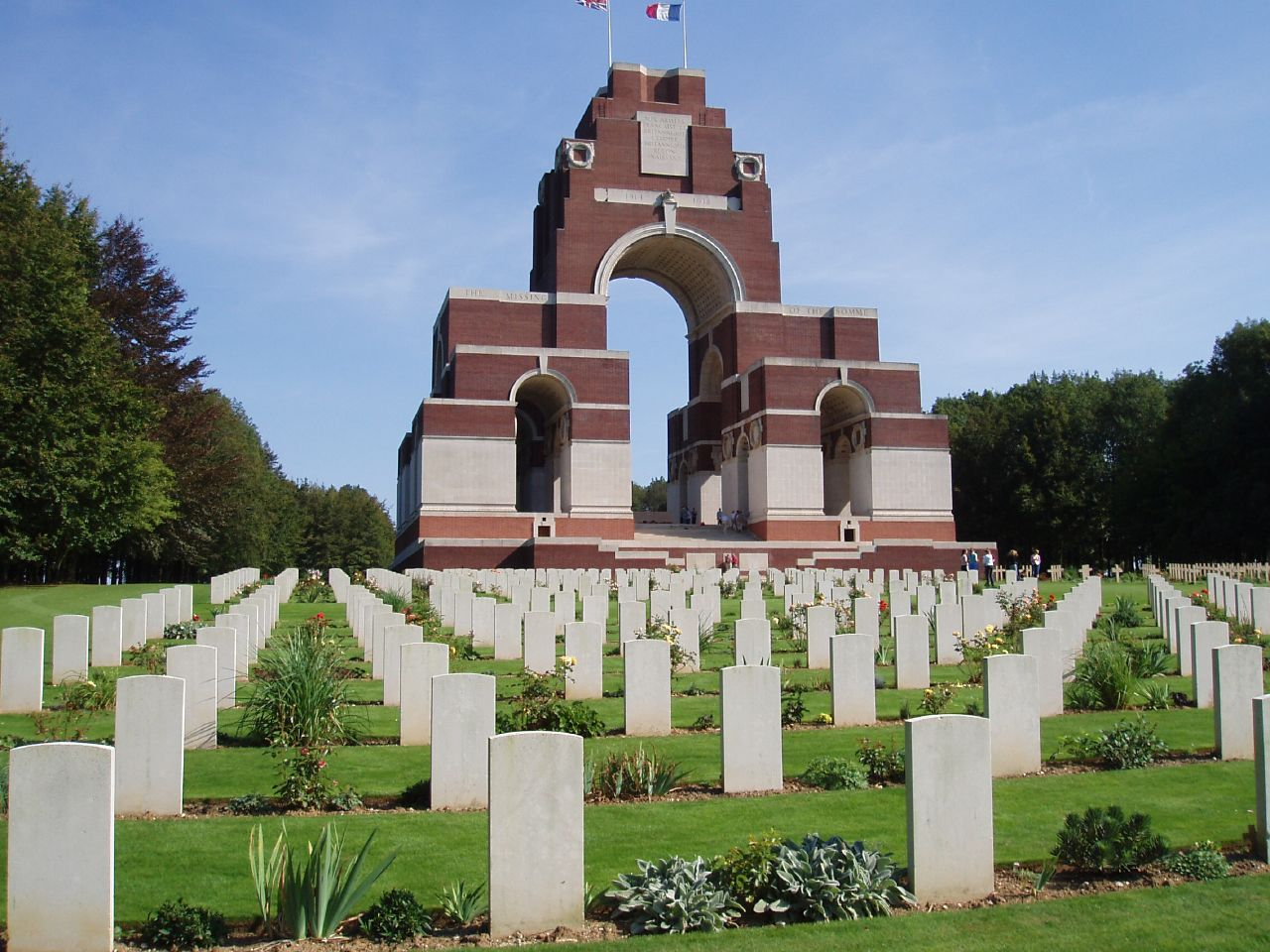
- The war cemetery in Thiepval
- Location of Thiepval
- Location within France Location within Hauts-de-France
- Coordinates: 50°03′19″N 2°41′23″E
- Country: France
- Region: Hauts-de-France
- Department: Somme
- Arrondissement: Péronne
- Canton: Albert
- Intercommunality: Pays du Coquelicot

Government
  - Mayor (2020–2026): Max Potié
- Area^{1}: 4.4 km^{2} (1.7 sq mi)
- Elevation: 141 m (463 ft)
- Highest elevation: 154 m (505 ft)
- Lowest elevation: 70 m (230 ft)
- Population (2023): 124
  - Density: 28/km^{2} (73/sq mi)
- Time zone: UTC+01:00 (CET)
  - Summer (DST): UTC+02:00 (CEST)
- INSEE/Postal code: 80753 /80300
- ^{1} French Land Register data, which excludes lakes, ponds, glaciers > 1 km^{2} (0.386 sq mi or 247 acres) and river estuaries.

Thiepval (French pronunciation: [tjɛpval]; Picard: Tièbvo) is a commune in the Somme department in Hauts-de-France in northern France.

Thiepval is located 7 kilometres (4 miles) north of Albert at the crossroads of the D73 and D151 and approximately 32 km (20 mi) northeast of Amiens.

== Population ==
Historical population
Year	Pop.	±% p.a.
1968	111	—
1975	93	−2.50%
1982	105	+1.75%
1990	116	+1.25%
1999	98	−1.86%
2007	106	+0.99%
2012	129	+4.01%
2017	129	+0.00%
2023	124	−0.66%
Source: INSEE

== First World War ==
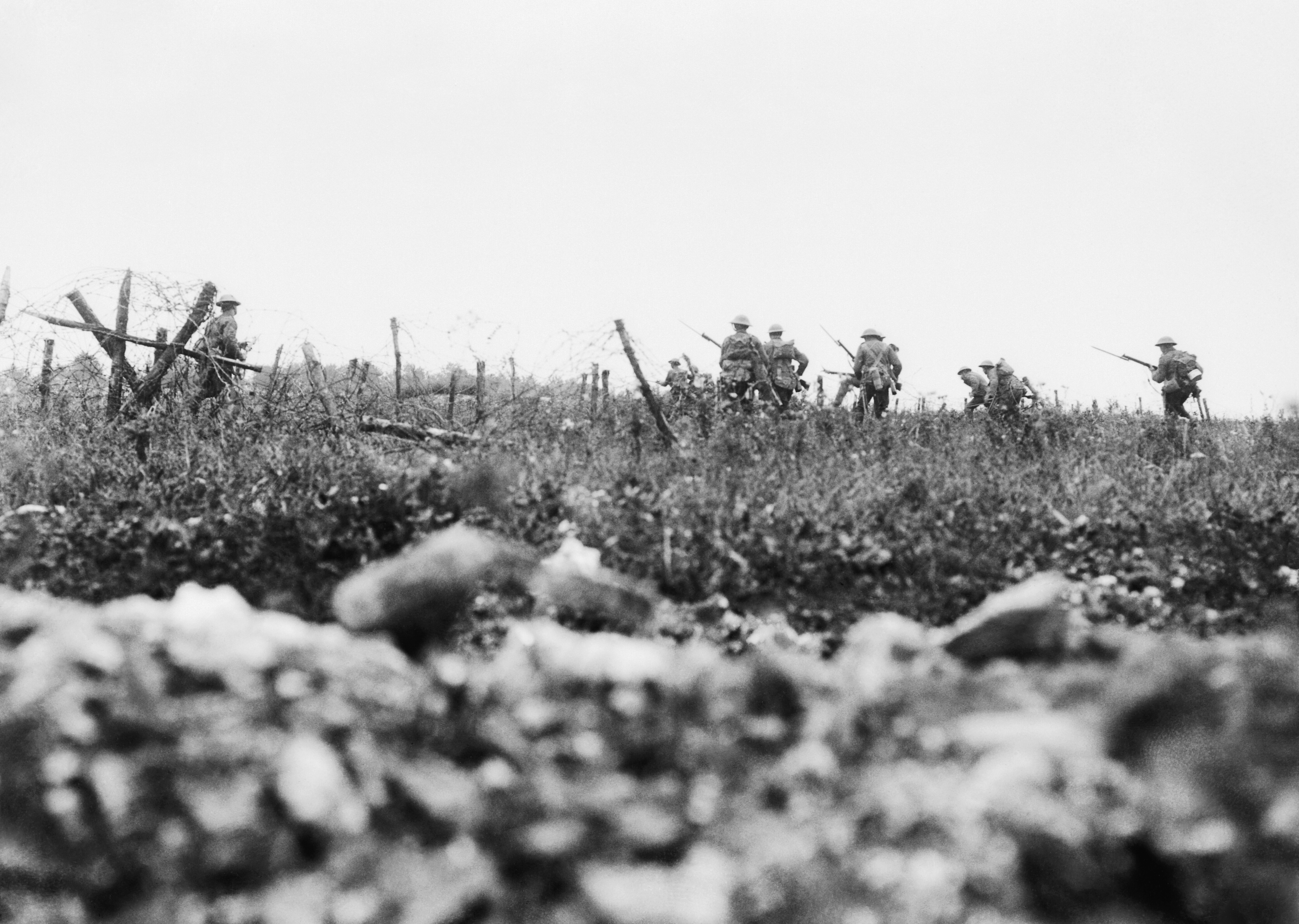
British infantry from the Wiltshire Regiment attacking near Thiepval, 7 August 1916, during the Battle of the Somme.

The original village was totally destroyed during the First World War. The present Thiepval occupies a location a short distance to the southwest of the former settlement. The Thiepval Memorial to the Missing of the Somme, a major war memorial to British and Commonwealth men who died in the First World War Battle of the Somme and who have no known grave, is located near the commune.

=== Memorials ===
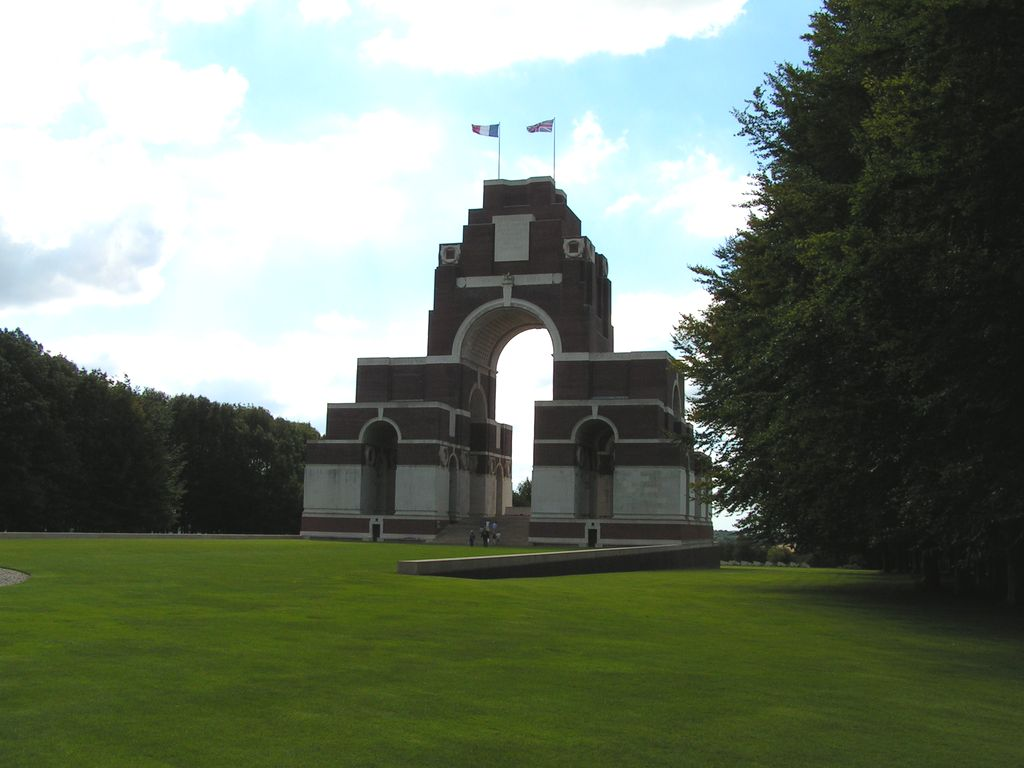
Thiepval Memorial to the Missing of the Somme

The First World War Franco-British Memorial and the Thiepval Memorial to the Missing of the Somme is an imposing monument of brick and stone standing 45 m (148 ft) high. It is visible for several kilometres in every direction. It is the work of the architect Sir Edwin Lutyens. The sixteen pillars are engraved with the names of 73,367 British and Commonwealth soldiers who fell during the Battle of the Somme between July and November 1916 and who have no known grave.

== See also ==
- Battle of Thiepval Ridge (1916)
- Ulster Tower Thiepval
- Schwaben Redoubt
