= Battle of Thiepval Ridge =

Battle on the Western Front during the First World War

- Part of The Battle of the Somme of the First World War
Date	26–28 September 1916
Location	Thiepval (France) and vicinity 50°3′16.3″N 2°41′18.2″E
Result	British victory

Belligerents
British Empire; Canada; United Kingdom; France	German Empire

Commanders and leaders
Douglas Haig; Hubert Gough; Joseph Joffre; Ferdinand Foch	Crown Prince Rupprecht; Max von Gallwitz; Fritz von Below

Strength
6 divisions	3 divisions

Casualties and losses
12,500	2,300–2,329 prisoners

The Battle of Thiepval Ridge was the first big offensive of the Reserve Army (Lieutenant General Hubert Gough), during the Battle of the Somme on the Western Front during the First World War. The attack was intended to benefit from the Fourth Army attack in the Battle of Morval by starting 24 hours afterwards. (Note: After the Battle of Flers–Courcelette on 22 September, the Anglo-French armies tried to press their advantage with several smaller attacks in quick succession, rather than pause to regroup and give the German armies time to recover. Periodisation by historians has given discrete dates for the Anglo-French battles but there were considerable overlaps and continuity of operations, until the weather and supply difficulties in mid-November ended the battle. The British Official History continues the narrative to 30 September, despite dating the battle from 26 to 28 September.) The battle was fought on a front from Courcelette in the east, near the Albert–Bapaume road, to Thiepval and the Schwaben Redoubt (Schwaben-Feste) in the west, which overlooked the German defences further north in the Ancre valley, the rising ground towards Beaumont-Hamel and Serre beyond.

Thiepval Ridge was elaborately fortified and the German defenders fought with great determination, while the British co-ordination of infantry and artillery declined after the first day, due to the confused nature of the fighting in the maze of trenches, dugouts and shell-craters. The final British objectives were not reached until a reorganisation of the Reserve Army and the Battle of the Ancre Heights (1 October – 11 November). Organisational difficulties and deteriorating weather frustrated General Joseph Joffre's intention to proceed with vigorous co-ordinated attacks by the Anglo-French armies.

Anglo-French attacks became disjointed and declined in effectiveness during late September, at the same time as a revival occurred in the German defence. The British experimented with new techniques in gas warfare, machine-gun bombardment and tank–infantry co-operation. The German defenders on the Somme front struggled to withstand the preponderance of men and material fielded by their opponents, despite reorganisation and substantial reinforcement of troops, artillery and aircraft from Verdun. September became the month most costly in casualties for the German armies on the Somme.

== Background ==
=== Tactical developments ===
Some debate had occurred among the Reserve Army staffs on tactics. The II Corps commander, Lieutenant-General Claud Jacob, advocated attacks by one line, to avoid supporting lines being caught in German counter-bombardments on the British front-line and no man's land, which usually fell 6–8 minutes after the beginning of an attack. Jacob considered that the supporting lines played little part in the success of the attack and merely added to casualties. Jacob also advocated afternoon attacks, since the six made by his corps had succeeded and the two dawn attacks had failed. The Reserve Army commander, Lieutenant-General Hubert Gough, was less certain but did lay stress on the supports crossing the danger zone swiftly. Gough also used the evidence of a film of an attack on 18 September, to decide against infantry advancing in groups, because of their vulnerability to artillery and because German defences in the gaps between groups were unsuppressed, allowing them to cut off the forward infantry and stop the advance of supporting groups and troops on the flanks.

== Prelude ==
=== British preparations ===
The 18th (Eastern) Division (Major-General Ivor Maxse), moved south after three weeks' battle training in the Third Army area, joining II Corps on 8 September. All company, battalion and brigade commanders reconnoitred the ground and a lecture was given by Brigadier-General Philip Howell, the II Corps Chief of Staff. Howell briefed the division on the local situation and recent experience which the unit commanders found helpful, having only been in Flanders since August. Two divisional field artilleries were attached to the division and II Corps put a battery of 6 in (150 mm) howitzers and four tanks at the disposal of the divisional commander. On 21 September, the trenches south of Thiepval were taken over from the 49th (West Riding) Division and work begun to prepare them for the attack. Royal Engineer field companies, pioneers and two battalions of infantry dug about 2,500 yd (1.4 mi; 2.3 km) of assembly and communication trenches and existing positions were also improved; supply dumps were prepared over four nights of digging. The road from Authuille to Thiepval was repaired and hidden behind a brushwood screen, which enabled supplies to be moved up and wounded to be brought down with little German shelling. The division arranged a stratagem, whereby the assembly and Hindenburg trenches were to be left empty after the first waves had advanced and the reserve battalion held back, to avoid the German counter-barrage. As soon as the counter-barrage stopped the troops were to advance rapidly in small columns.

=== British plan ===
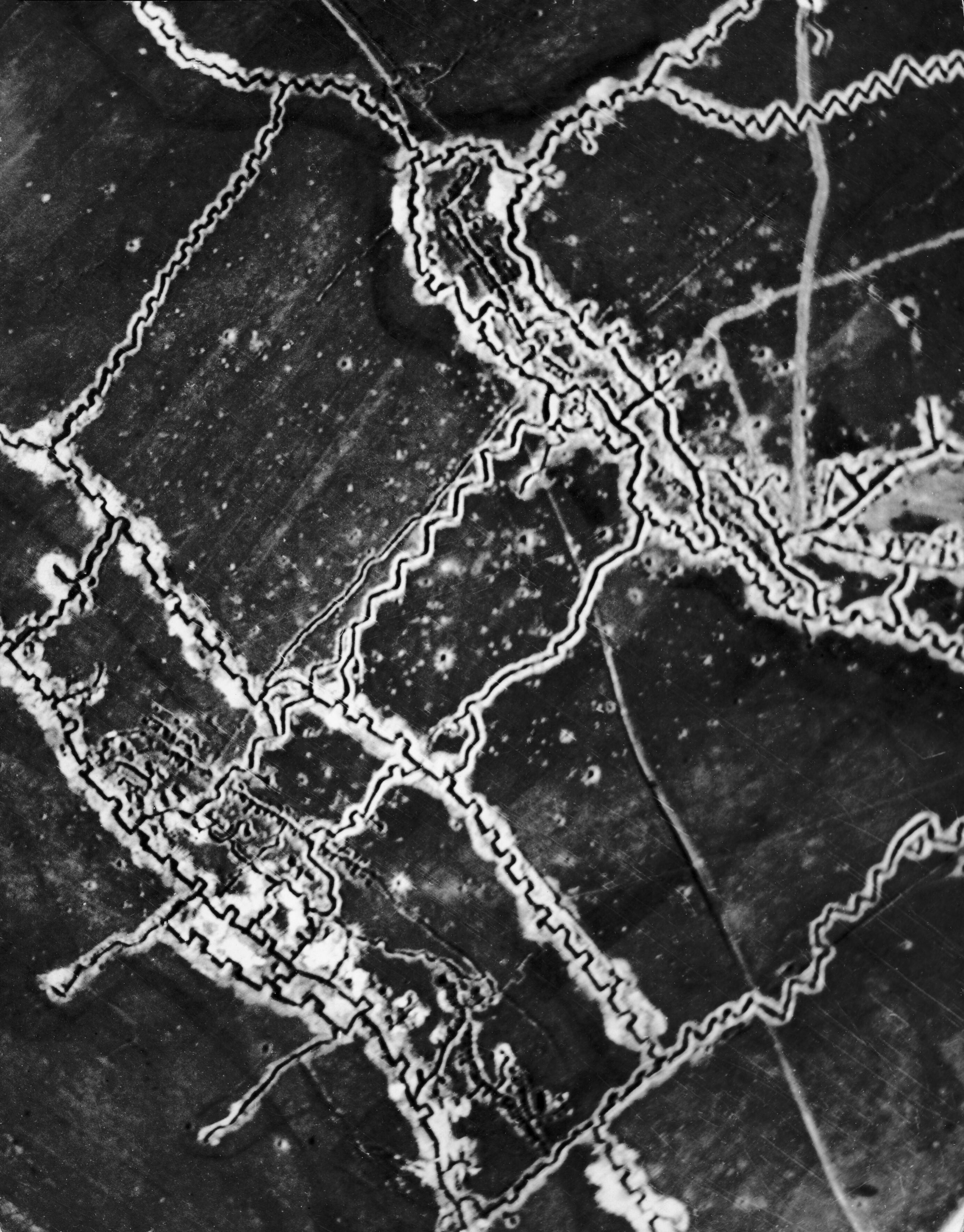
Schwaben Redoubt aerial photograph, 1916 (IWM HU 91107)

General Sir Douglas Haig, Commander-in-Chief of the British Expeditionary Force (BEF) on the Western Front, directed the Reserve Army to attack towards Achiet le Grand and the Third Army to stand ready to attack at Gommecourt as a flank guard. Gough, ordered the attack for 26 September at 12:35 p.m., to push the Germans off the high ground of the Thiepval Ridge, from Courcelette 6,000 yd (3.4 mi; 5.5 km) west to Schwaben Redoubt, by the Canadian Corps (Lieutenant-General Julian Byng) and II Corps, each with two divisions in the attack. Three stages were set for the advance, with halts of ten minutes and one hour before the final advance.

The Canadian Corps was to provide a flank guard on the right, by taking the German trenches on the spur north-west of Courcelette, the right of II Corps was to take Zollern Redoubt Zollern-Feste in the second stage of the advance and Stuff Redoubt at the final objective on the crest of the ridge. On the left the corps was to take Thiepval in the second stage and then reach Schwaben Redoubt, which overlooked the slope down to St Pierre Divion. It was emphasised that the Germans were to be driven off the crest, to deny the Germans observation towards Albert and gain observation over the Ancre valley. The German front line west of Thiepval was to be captured during the advance.

About 230 heavy guns, howitzers and mortars with 570 field guns and howitzers were available, the guns of V Corps north of the Ancre, being used to fire on the German river crossings and trenches on the south bank from behind. II Corps artillery was to pay special attention the demoralisation of the German garrisons of the redoubts and Thiepval village, while certain German trenches intended for the British infantry to occupy were not bombarded sufficiently for destruction. Two changes were introduced into the artillery plan, gas shell was to be fired by 4 in (100 mm) mortars and the machine guns of both attacking corps, were arranged to fire overhead barrages into the gaps between the artillery barrage lines. The creeping barrage was to move at 100 yd (91 m) in three minutes, then at 100 yd (91 m) in two minutes, when no man's land and the German front position had been crossed.

Six of the eight tanks available were allotted to II Corps. Divisional reliefs were to be delayed to keep the attacking troops fresh, beginning on the night of 22/23 September on the right and 24/25 September on the left. Zero hour was set for the afternoon instead of dawn, because Maxse wanted only three hours of daylight for the consolidation on the final objective, so that most of the work would be done after dark, to avoid exposure to observed artillery fire. The Thiepval attack was to be followed by an attack astride the Ancre River. Orders for the capture of more objectives and to gain ground at every opportunity, were issued on 28 September and were intended to combine with the Fourth Army attacks planned for early October, which became known as the Battle of Le Transloy; Stuff and Schwaben redoubts were to be captured by 29 September and Stuff Trench by 1 October.

=== German preparations ===
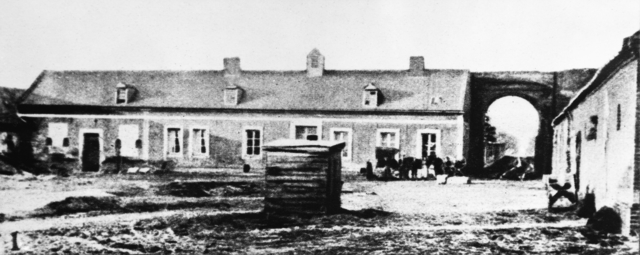
Mouquet Farm before its destruction. (AWM J00181)

The German front position was held by the 7th Division, 8th Division and the 26th Reserve Division, from Courcelette westwards to Thiepval. The village was garrisoned by two regiments, one attached from the 2nd Guard Reserve Division; the ground from Thiepval to St Pierre Divion was held by a regiment detached from the 52nd Division. The German front position on the south face of Thiepval was about 300 yd (270 m) in front of the village; about 1,000 yd (910 m) back was the second line, Staufen Riegel ("Stuff Trench" to the British and "Regina Trench" to the Canadians) about 1,000 yd (910 m) and another 1,000 yd (910 m) further back was the third line, Grandcourt Riegel (Grandcourt Trench). The cellars under Thiepval Château had been extended into a complex of tunnels used as storehouses and shelters. A sunken road running up the middle of the village to the cemetery had been lined with dug-outs and in the original front-line to the west were 144 deep dug-outs.

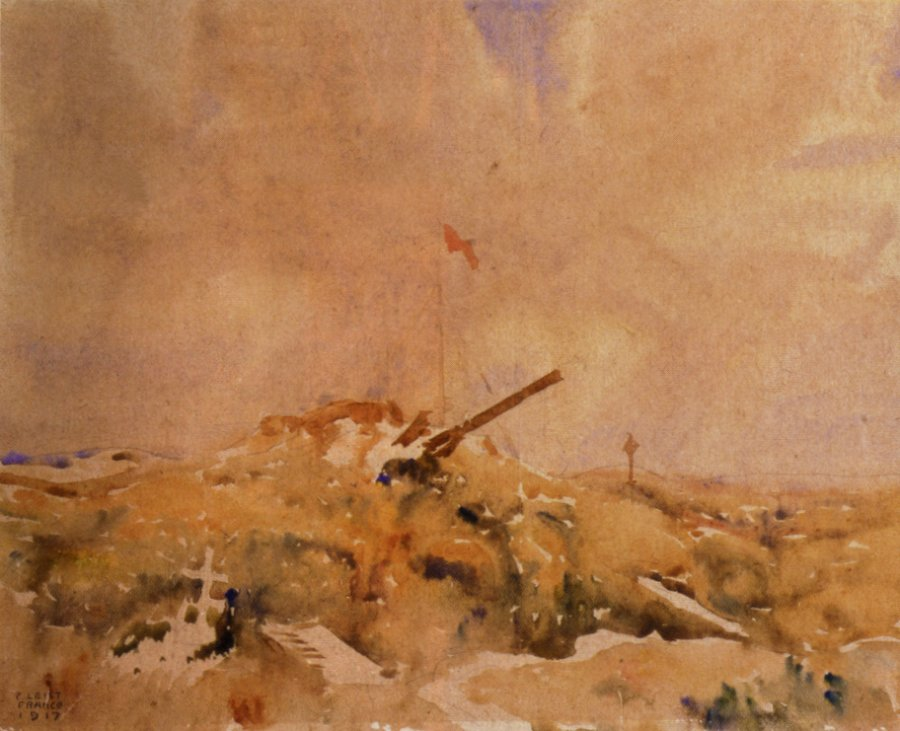
Mouquet Farm Pozieres. (Painted by Fred Leist.)

Thiepval had been held by Württemberg Infantry Regiment 180 (WIR 180) since 1914, which still contained many pre-war trained soldiers. The regiment had not been moved and was allowed to make its own arrangements, using Bapaume as a base. Zollern Redoubt guarded the first line between Courcelette and Thiepval, Staufen (Stuff) and Schwaben redoubts anchored the west end of the first and second lines. Mouquet Farm, to the east of Thiepval, had become dangerously isolated, 350 yd (320 m) beyond any support trenches, connected only by a half-demolished trench. The losses incurred in its defence weakened the garrison in the area, for little corresponding gain. Beyond the south-west of Thiepval, the original German front position ran northwards to St Pierre Divion and the Ancre. The German garrisons were alerted that an attack was imminent on 22 September and German artillery began harassing fire on British trenches and supply dumps. The British assembly for the attack early on 26 September went undisturbed.

== Battle ==
=== Reserve Army ===
==== 23–26 September ====
Somme weather 23–30 September 1916
Date	mm rain	°F	
23	0	66°–43°	fine
24	0	72°–45°	mist sun
25	0	73°–50°	fine
26	0.1	75°–54°	fine
27	0.1	72°–52°	rain
28	1	73°–54°	rain
29	17	61°–54°	rain
30	0	63°–41°	dull

The preliminary bombardment began on 23 September in poor visibility and mist rose morning and evening for the next few days. II Corps fired 60,000 field artillery and 45,000 heavy artillery rounds. On the afternoon of 24 September a detachment of the Special Brigade fired 500 lachrymatory (gas) shells into Thiepval, which silenced German trench mortars by 5:00 p.m. A preliminary operation to capture Mouquet Farm began on the evening of 24 September, when a company from the 11th Division reached the farm, before a German bombardment and a bombing attack covered by accurate machine-gun fire, forced the British back. The creeping barrage began prompt at 12:35 p.m. on 26 September and the infantry began their advance.

On the right flank, the Canadian Corps attacked with the 6th Canadian Brigade of the 2nd Canadian Division on the right, as flank guard and the 1st Canadian Division on the left. At 12:35 p.m., the 6th Canadian Brigade advanced behind a creeping barrage with three battalions and two attached tanks, though a German counter-barrage kept the right-hand battalion in its trenches. Both tanks were lost early but the 29th Canadian Battalion in the centre reached the German front line in ten minutes, while the left battalion was stopped by machine-gun fire from ahead and the left flank, except for a few troops on the right. At 10:50 p.m. the objective was captured from Twenty Road, westwards to the east end of Miraumont Road and held against two counter-attacks during the night.

The 1st Canadian Division attacked with two brigades. The right brigade with two battalions advanced 400 yd (370 m) to Sudbury Trench and resumed the advance at 1:00 p.m., reaching Kenora Trench on the right which ran north-west back to Regina/Stuff Trench by 2:40 p.m. The battalion on the left had been delayed; German bombers counter-attacked the flank and were repulsed. The left battalion had formed up in no man's land to escape the German counter-barrage but had a harder fight to reach their objectives, taking until mid-afternoon to reach the second objective, which was just short of the ridge crest, linking with the left brigade later.

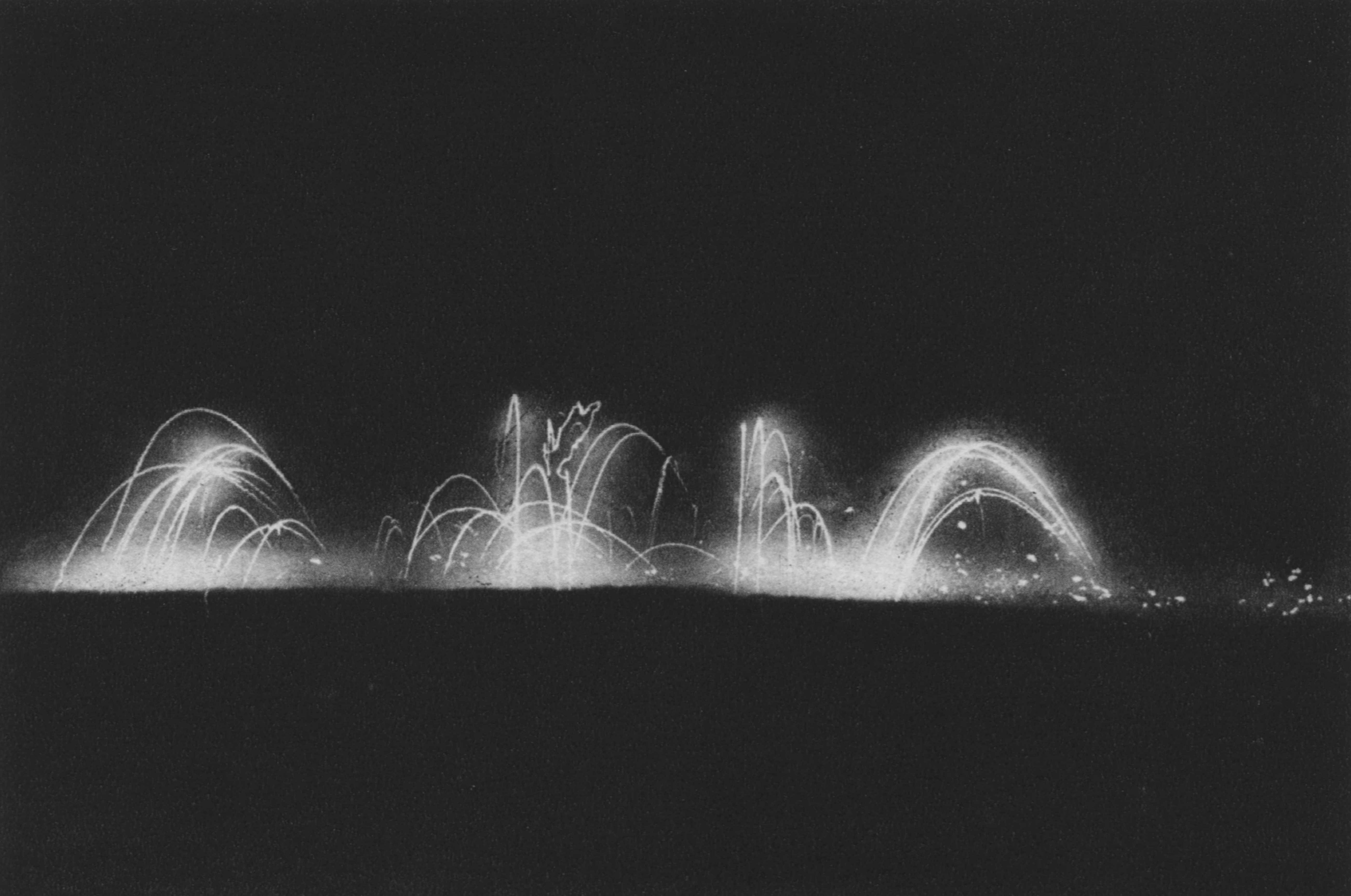
Night scene at Thiepval

The left brigade advanced with two reinforced battalions, which received machine-gun fire from the left flank but reached Zollern Trench, taking the western part after a delay. At 1:00 p.m., the advance resumed towards Hessian Trench, which was taken easily. Touch was gained with the right brigade but contact with the 11th Division on the left was not gained. The Canadians bombed down Zollern Trench and built a barricade, as machine-gun fire forced a slight withdrawal from the left part of Hessian Trench, a defensive flank being thrown back from Hessian to Zollern Trench and dug in by 10:30 p.m.

West of the Canadian Corps, II Corps attacked with the 11th and 18th (Eastern) divisions. The 11th Division advanced with two brigades. The 34th Brigade on the right attacked with two battalions; a bombing party attacking Mouquet Farm just before zero and then guarding the dugout exits. Both battalions got to the German support trench (first objective) although one of the supporting battalions was caught by the German counter-barrage at the British front-line. The right-hand battalion became bogged down fighting through Zollern Redoubt and most of the moppers-up were killed. About 50 survivors dug in on the right facing Zollern Trench, while others sheltered to the west of the redoubt. The left battalion was caught by machine-gun fire from Zollern Redoubt and Midway Line, which ran from Mouquet Farm to Schwaben Redoubt, north of Thiepval. A few troops reached Zollern Trench and the remnants of the support battalion advanced to reinforce them.

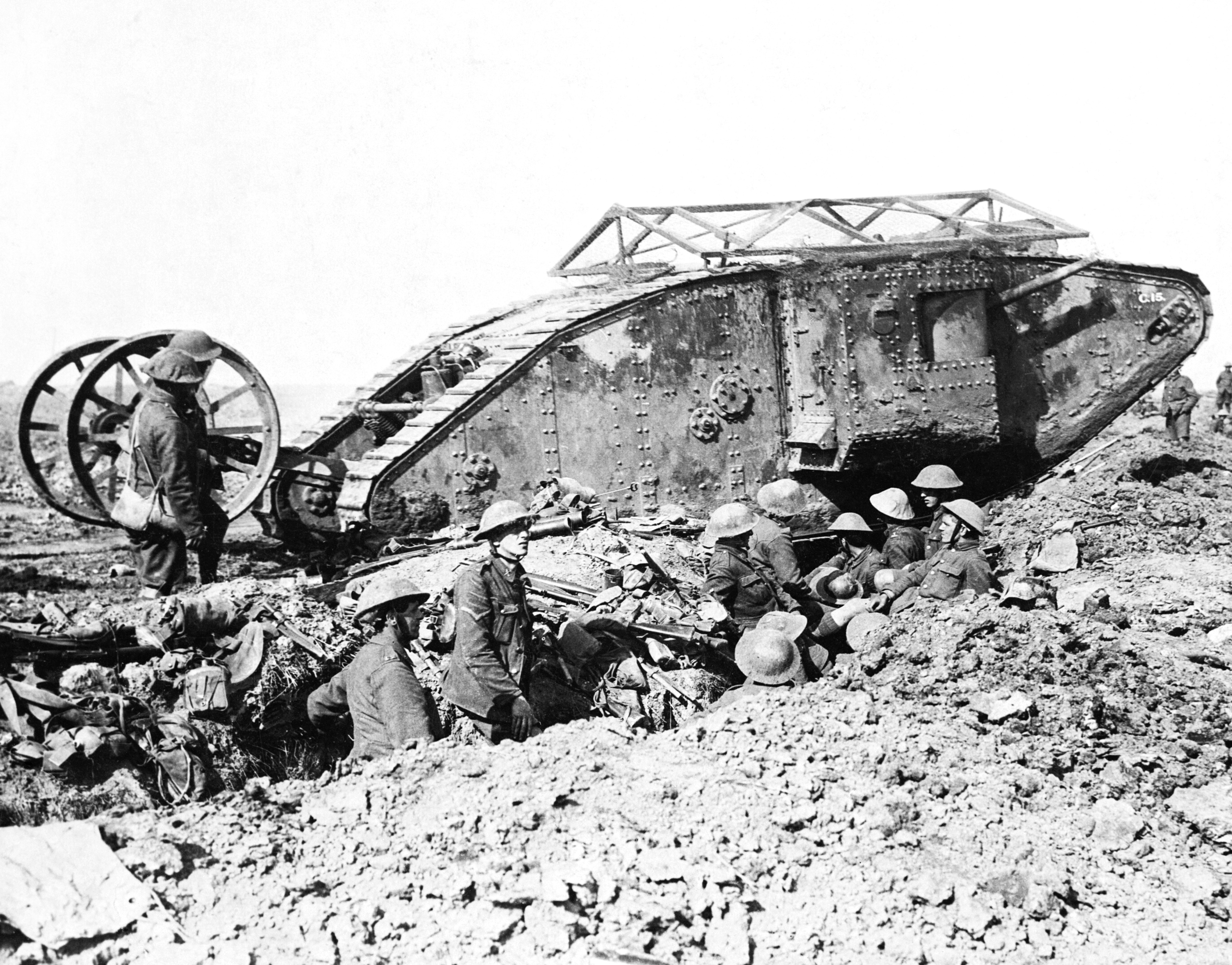
British Tank (male) Mark I, Somme, 25 September 1916.

The battle for Mouquet Farm continued; two attached tanks ditched nearby and the machine-guns from one tank were removed and the crew carried on as infantry. Reinforcements were sent forward (including a pioneer battalion) and at 5:30 p.m. the last 56 Germans surrendered, after being attacked with smoke bombs. The 33rd Brigade on the left attacked from Nab Valley with two battalions, reached Joseph Trench at 12:45 p.m. and advanced to Schwaben Trench between Mouquet Farm and the east end of Thiepval where they dug in. Zollern Trench was reached by 1:30 p.m. and Hessian Trench by 4:00 p.m. except for the 250 yd (230 m) on the right. Touch was gained on the left with the 18th (Eastern) Division at Zollern Trench and Midway Line was mopped up by a reserve battalion which also reinforced Hessian Trench, repelling a German counter-attack on the right.

The 18th (Eastern) Division attacked with two battalions of the 53rd Brigade on the right from Nab Valley with a battalion following-on. The plan to avoid the German counter-barrage worked and the first objective, at Schwaben Trench on the right and the Pozières–St Pierre Divion road on the left, was reached in 12 minutes. Two tanks advanced in support but quickly ditched as the battalions advanced again, reaching Zollern Trench by 1:15 p.m. against slight resistance. The advance was stopped by German machine-gun fire after another 250 yd (230 m) and the troops fell back to Zollern Trench at dark and then tried to bomb forward. The 54th Brigade attacked on a narrow 300 yd (270 m) front, with one battalion going through the village, a company advancing along the original German front line, with the other two battalions in support and reserve following on. The advanced troops moved forward before zero hour to avoid the German artillery and two tanks advanced from Caterpillar Copse. The advance through Thiepval went slowly, being held up by machine-gun fire from the château ruins, until a tank came up and suppressed the German machine-guns, before ditching a short time later. The infantry lost the barrage but fought on through the village until by 2:30 p.m., all but the north-west corner was captured.

==== 27–30 September ====
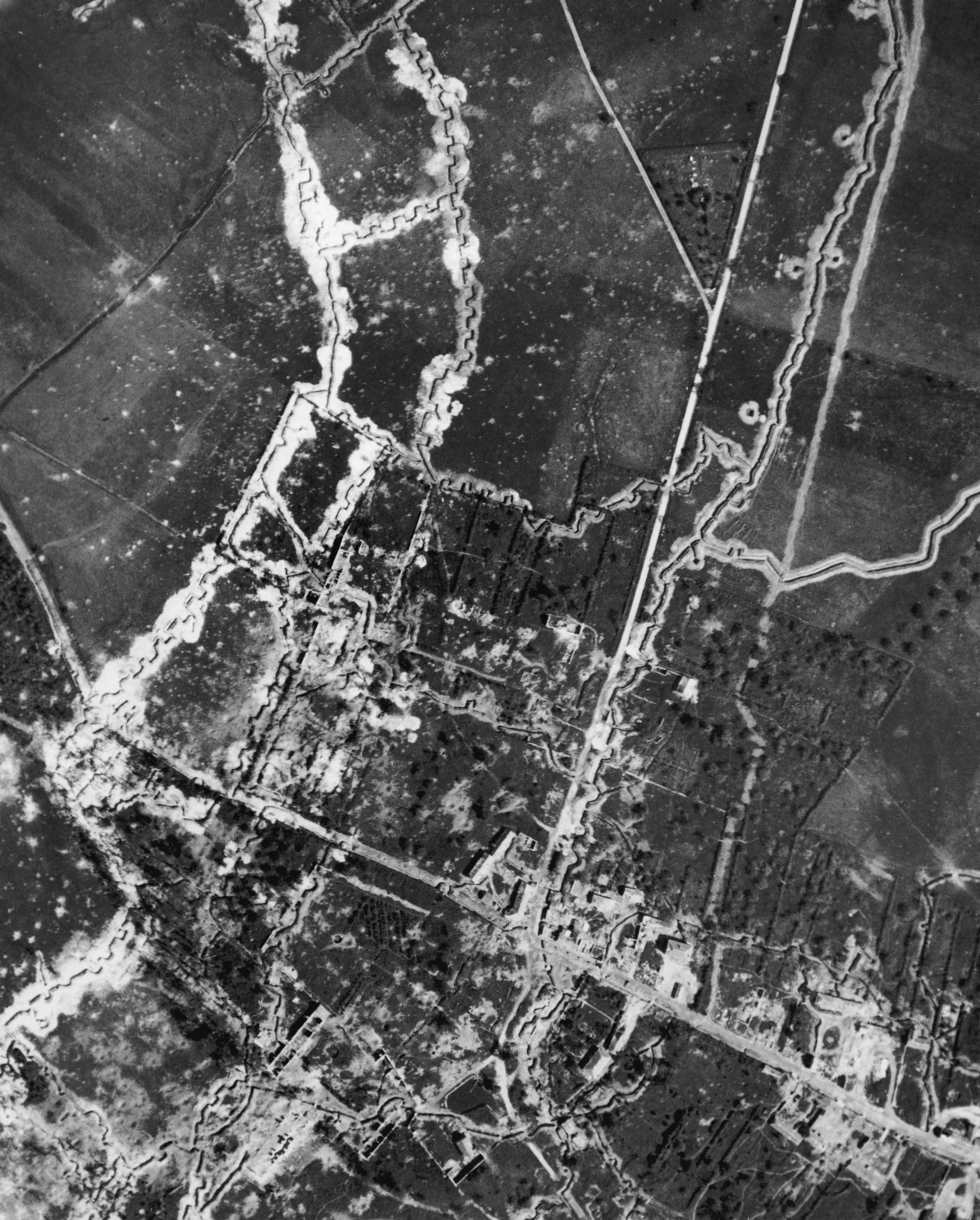
Thiepval aerial photograph, 1916. (IWM HU 91108)

After a German artillery bombardment on the 6th Brigade, 2nd Canadian Division all night and the morning of 27 September, patrols found that the Germans had withdrawn and the brigade advanced to the German practice trenches up Dyke Road, running north-east from Courcelette and occupied the rest of the first objective. The 1st Canadian Division was counter-attacked at Kenora Trench in the early hours and was forced back until an attack re-occupied the trench. Around 6:00 p.m. a German bombing attack nearly retook the trench, until repulsed at the last moment; later the Canadians withdrew to the support trench and then made a counter-attack at 2:00 a.m. which failed. In the II Corps area, the 11th Division found the Zollern Redoubt empty. Zollern Trench was occupied westwards to the junction with Midway Line and eastwards to link with the Canadians. An advance due at 10:00 a.m. was stopped by machine-gun fire from Stuff Redoubt and Hessian Trench. The 32nd Brigade in reserve was ordered to continue the attack at 3:00 p.m.

The attack was postponed but one of the two battalions attacked and reached the south side of Stuff Redoubt. An hour later Hessian Trench to the west was captured and at 9:00 p.m. a battalion began bombing forward from Zollern Redoubt to the north-west. The left brigade attacked eastwards during the morning, linked with the 34th Brigade and at 3:00 p.m., the rest of Hessian Trench was occupied. The 53rd Brigade on the right of the 18th (Eastern) Division consolidated Zollern Trench, then took part of Bulgaren Trench behind a Stokes mortar barrage. Unit reliefs were completed quickly in the 54th Brigade on the left and the attack through Thiepval resumed at 5:45 a.m., in company with a 146th Brigade battalion of the 49th (West Riding) Division, in the original British front line west of Thiepval. All of Thiepval had been captured by 11:00 a.m. and touch gained with the 53rd Brigade, 146th Brigade being relieved by a 25th Division brigade overnight.

On 28 September, a cavalry patrol moved forward on the right of the 6th Brigade, 2nd Canadian Division at dawn but was quickly stopped by machine-gun fire. The brigade dug in facing north-east beyond the German practice trenches and a battalion advanced north up Courcelette Trench, meeting much German machine-gun fire from Regina Trench. Two more attempts were made in the afternoon and another in the evening at 8:30 p.m. which failed. During the night, the four Canadian brigades engaged were relieved by the 4th and 8th brigades. In II Corps the 32nd Brigade took over on the right of the 11th Division, ready to take Stuff Redoubt and Hessian Trench at 6:00 p.m. but the attack was delayed. A bombing attack into the rest of Stuff Redoubt gained ground but this was later abandoned. The 18th (Eastern) Division was to attack Schwaben Redoubt at 1:00 p.m., the right brigade along Zollern Trench to Midway Line, while an extra battalion attacked the redoubt and a battalion from the 54th Brigade attacked on the left, down to the original front line.

Bulgar Trench was taken quickly but the Germans in Midway Line held out longer. By 2:30 p.m., the east end of Schwaben Redoubt was approached and touch was gained on the right with the 11th Division. Troops later reached the south-west corner of the redoubt and by 5:00 p.m., the south side of the redoubt had been captured and linked with the troops in Midway Line to the right, as the left gained touch with mixed groups from the 54th Brigade. The west of the redoubt was taken by 8:00 p.m. and patrols from the 49th (West Riding) Division occupied parts of the German front line, then met the troops on the left of the 54th Brigade. Grenade skirmishes occurred intermittently during the night and a battalion from the 55th Brigade took over the front of the 54th Brigade.

On 29 September, the 8th Brigade from the 3rd Canadian Division attacked at noon with the 11th Division on the left and reached Hessian Trench in places, which were lost and then regained during German shelling and counter-attacks. In the II Corps area, the 11th Division attacked Stuff Redoubt and Hessian Trench to the right, most of which were captured and touch gained with the Canadians, while the attack on the redoubt failed. After battalion reliefs in the 18th (Eastern) Division, a bombing fight began around 7:30 a.m. along the western edge of Schwaben Redoubt, which lasted all day; the ground gained could not be held and the battalion later relieved troops in the captured German front system. On 30 September, the 11th Division resumed the attack on Stuff Redoubt at 4:00 p.m., with bombing parties advancing west along Hessian Trench and along Zollern Trench, which by nightfall had taken the southern half of the redoubt. Canadian bombers assisted the capture of Hessian Trench and the division was relieved by the 25th Division overnight. A dawn counter-attack drove the 18th (Eastern) Division from the south and west sides of Schwaben Redoubt; the south side was recaptured and the north side of the redoubt was taken at 4:00 p.m. Another German attack at 9:00 p.m. retook the north face, up to the entrance to Stuff Trench on the right.

=== Air operations ===
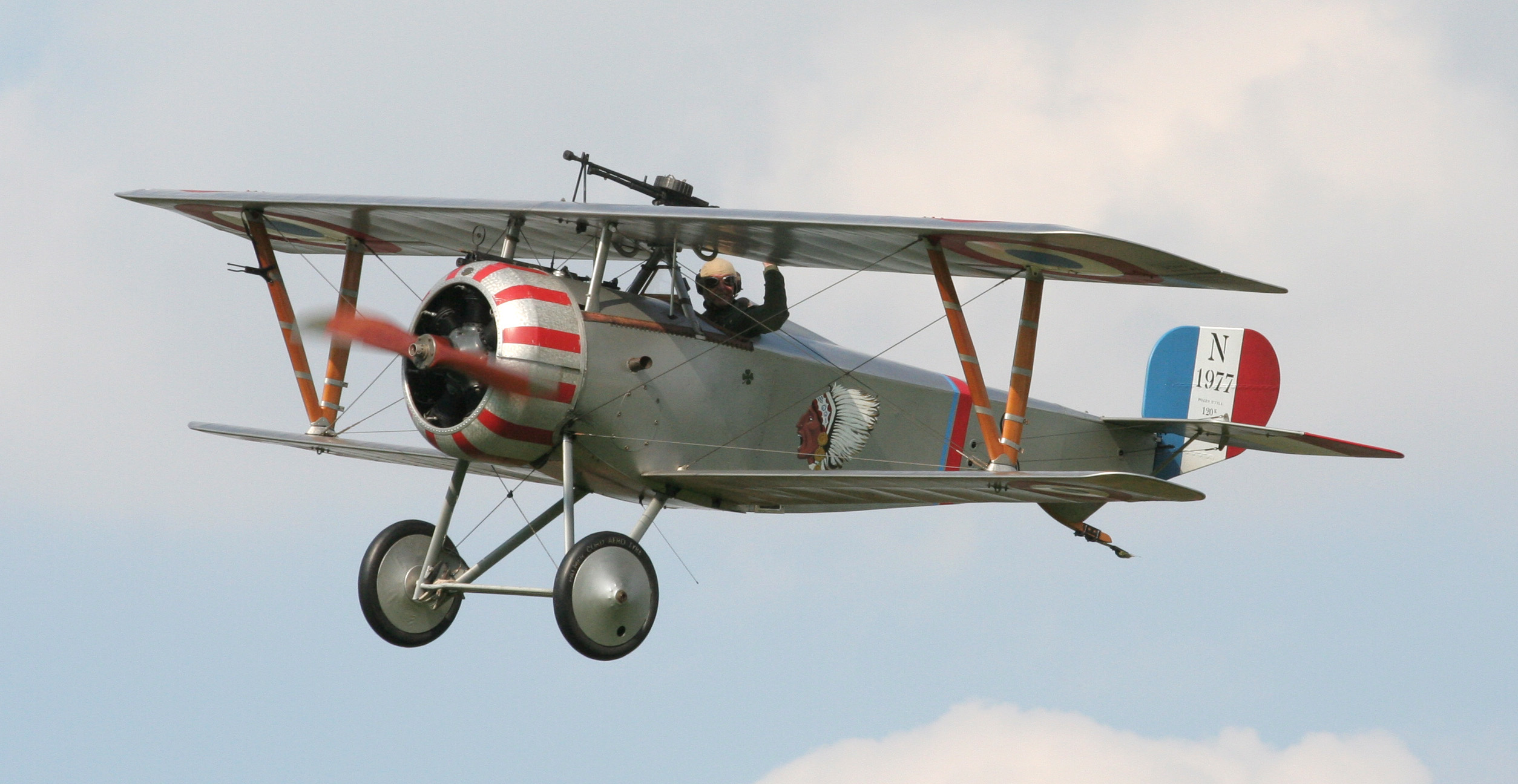
Nieuport 17

4 Squadron and 7 Squadron made a number of low reconnaissance flights to observe the condition of the German wire and trenches before the attack. (Note: Air observers could identify troops from 700 ft (210 m) and in good light could distinguish occupied trenches from 2,000 ft (610 m).) GHQ Wing and Corps squadron air observers on contact patrol, watched the infantry advance behind the creeping barrage and enter Thiepval with two tanks, which prompted some German soldiers to run away. At 1:10 p.m. British troops were photographed in Hessian Trench and air observers were able to report the capture of Thiepval, save for the north-west corner. Artillery observers in aircraft and observation balloons reported 64 active German batteries in the first 24 hours and identified the positions of 103 more. Ground observers were able to engage six German batteries, while air observation allowed another 22 to be bombarded. South of Miraumont a 4 Squadron air observer reported c. 1,000 German troops on the road, who were scattered by British heavy artillery. The squadrons of IV and V Brigades dropped a hundred and thirty-five 20-pound bombs on trenches, artillery and billets as III Brigade bombed Lagnicourt aerodrome despite poor visibility and attacked German kite balloons, 60 Squadron Nieuports shooting down two with Le Prieur rockets and bombing grounded balloons with phosphorus bombs. 19 Squadron attacked a German divisional headquarters at Barastre with 64 x 20-pound bombs. Two German aircraft were shot down and four damaged for the loss of one British aircraft over Bapaume but the faster German machines were able to avoid contact at will.

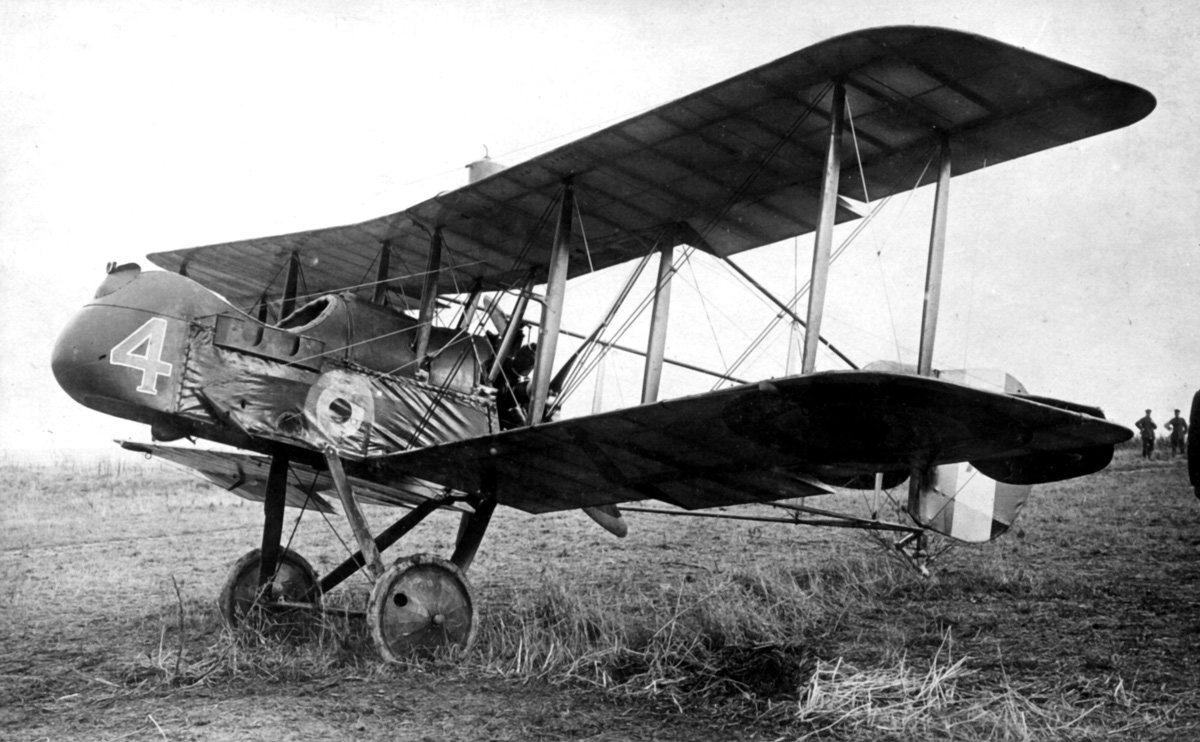
Airco DH.2

Next day British offensive patrols met numerous German formations in the morning, before heavy rain interrupted flying. Six aircraft of 27 Squadron were attacked by five Albatros D.I of Jagdstaffel 2 (Jasta 2) led by Oswald Boelcke, which shot down three and damaged one of the Martinsydes. (Note: By the beginning of the Battle of the Somme, the Imperial German Flying Corps (Die Fliegertruppen des deutschen Kaiserreiches/Die Fliegertruppen) had received a few Halberstadt D.II and LFG Roland D.Is which outclassed the Royal Aircraft Factory B.E.12, Morane-Saulnier L and other older British and French designs. The Albatros D.II began to equip Jagdstaffeln (Jastas), new specialist German fighter squadrons, formed from August 1916.) Another British aircraft was lost on an early morning railway reconnaissance by 70 Squadron. On 28 September V Brigade aircraft reported the British advances at Schwaben Redoubt and directed artillery fire on 31 gun pits and blew up nine ammunition stores. Few German aircraft appeared but two were shot down and two damaged, one of the aircraft being shot down by a new Spad S.VII, flown by a pilot of 60 Squadron. Poor weather grounded most aircraft on 29 September but next day was clear, 500 air photographs were obtained and low reconnaissance observed the state of German trenches and wire. With the capture of Stuff Redoubt and most of Schwaben Redoubt, the denial of air observation to the Germans became more important and eleven aircraft raided Lagnicourt aerodrome again, escorted by 11 Squadron and 60 Squadron. Many German aircraft were able to take off and attack the British aircraft as they returned, three German aircraft being shot down and one damaged for a loss of one F.E. 2b.

=== German 1st Army ===
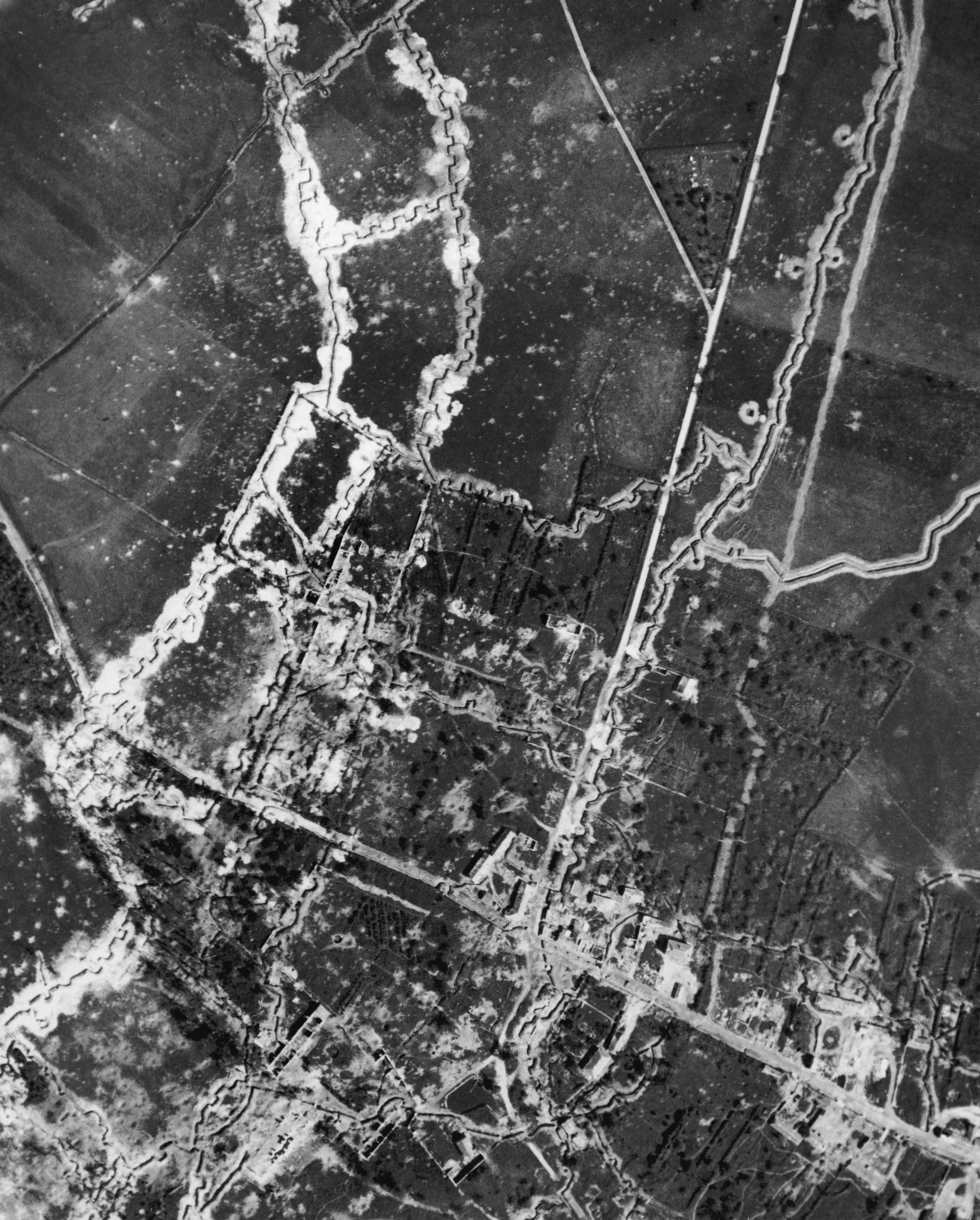
Thiepval aerial photograph, 1 June 1916

The 7th Division near Courcelette had all three regiments forward, with a battalion each in the front, support and reserve lines. The front trenches next to the Albert–Bapaume road were lost quickly, while Infantry Regiment 72 (IR 72) in the centre held its ground and the right-hand regiment was pushed back slowly, having managed to ambush the Canadians by occupying Fabeck Graben (Fabeck Trench) in no man's land, which the British artillery planners had ignored, thinking that it was derelict. The Germans were quickly outflanked and the fifty survivors surrendered at 12:55 p.m. The Canadians pressed forward on both flanks and quickly overran Zollern Graben (Zollern Trench). By 1:30 p.m. IR 72 had both flanks in the air, when reinforcements from the support battalion made a defensive flank along the sunken part of the Courcelette–Miraumont road, south of Staufen Riegel (Stuff Trench) and the rest joined Reserve Infantry Regiment 393 on the left flank.

At dusk the British artillery turned Zollern Graben into a moonscape, while British aircraft machine-gunned the trench from 150 ft (46 m). A Canadian attack was repulsed and a second attempt at midnight was stopped with the help of reinforcements. The Canadians had pressed forward on both flanks and got round either side of Zollern Graben and the east end of Hessen Weg, (Hessian Trench) which fell when the front and support battalions of IR 26 were annihilated. Few soldiers made it back to Staufen Riegel, to hold the 1,700 yd (1,600 m) of the trench that the regiment was responsible for but they managed to stop the Canadian advance all afternoon, except for the loss of 200 yd (180 m) of the trench near the Courcelette–Grandcourt road. After dark the 7th Division withdrew south to Staufen Riegel and east to cover Pys in the Below-Feste (Below Fortification).

Infantry Regiment 93 of the 8th Division, held the defences from Zollern Redoubt and part of Zollern Riegel to the east edge of Thiepval, with supports in Hessen Weg and Staufen Riegel. Infantry Regiment 165 continued the line west along Mouquet Riegel (Mouquet Trench) to the Thiepval–Pozières road, with a company in Mouquet Farm and the support battalions in Grüne-Feste (Green Redoubt), (Midway Line) Hessen Weg and Staufen Riegel and Infantry Regiment 153 (IR 153) held Grosser Riegel from the Pozières road to the east edge of Thiepval with the supports in Schwaben Riegel and Hessen Weg. The defence of IR 153 on the outskirts of Thiepval collapsed when three tanks appeared, proving to be immune to machine-gun fire and hand-grenades. All 1 1/2 battalions of German troops in the area of Grosser Riegel (Big Trench) and Schwaben Riegel (Swabian Trench), were overrun by British infantry, hardly any escaping. Dust and smoke from the artillery hung in the air during the afternoon and shrouded the British infantry advance to Hessen Weg, where two reserve companies held them up.

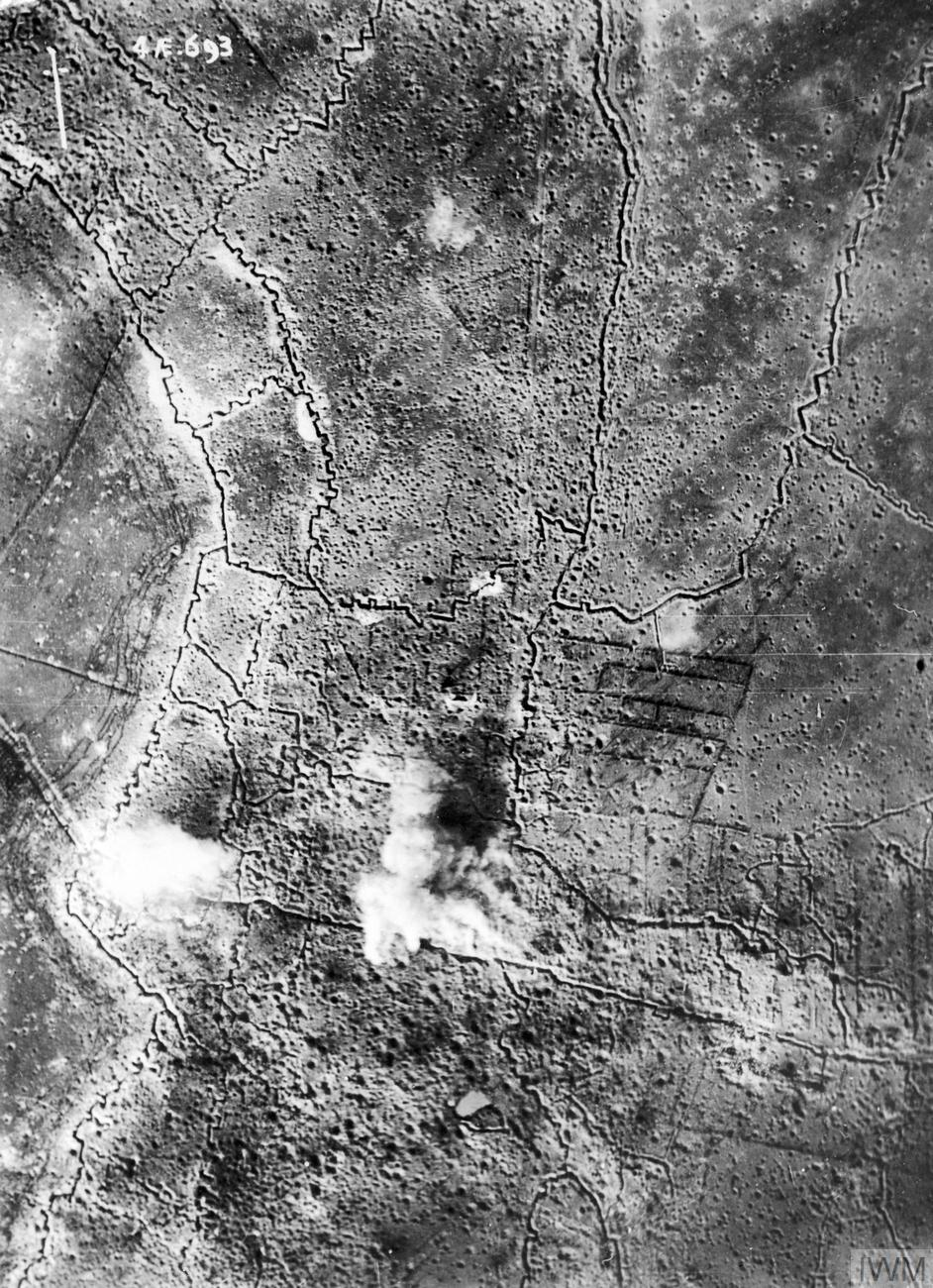
Aerial photograph of Thiepval under bombardment, 25 September 1916

The German defence on either side was outflanked, on the left Mouquet Farm was surrounded (holding out until 6:00 p.m.). Mouquet Riegel was captured, IR 165 to the left being forced back along Feste Grüne (Green Fortification). The Germans in Zollern Redoubt held on, helped by an accurate counter-barrage falling 150 yd (140 m) beyond. A British artillery battery which tried to un-limber 1,000 yd (910 m) to the south-west, was knocked out with machine-gun fire. After another bombardment, the British resumed the attack at 3:00 p.m. and were repulsed. Canadian troops advancing to the left began to threaten the left flank, as British troops got past on the right and then caused the survivors to withdraw to Hessen Weg. During the night Staufen Riegel was made the first line and ground still occupied in front of it was to be held by advanced posts. By early morning the new divisional front line had been established between Hessen Weg and Staufen Riegel, touch on the left being gained at the Grandcourt–Courcelette road with the right of the 7th Division and the right being extended to the Feste Grüne.

Infantry Regiment 180 (IR 180) of the 26th Reserve Division held Thiepval with part of Reserve Infantry Regiment 77; Schwaben Redoubt and the old front line north-west to St Pierre Divion were held by Infantry Regiment 66. The support and reserve battalions were in Schwaben Riegel, Feste Grüne and Staufen Riegel. The digging of British assembly trenches was seen before the attack, alerting the defenders and the first two waves of British infantry were shot down. A tank appeared from Authuille Wood leading a third wave, which collected survivors of the first two and came close to the German position, just as IR 180 companies, on the south and west sides of the Thiepval defences, were attacked from behind by British bombers moving west. Some British troops reached Bulgaren Weg (Bulgar Trench) behind Thiepval, where the support companies managed to stop the British moving further west. In 30 minutes the British had also reached Grüne-Feste and probed beyond Hessen Weg. At 6:30 p.m. a carrier pigeon arrived at the 26th Reserve Division headquarters, with a message that eighteen men were left in the I Battalion dug-out. The Thiepval garrison suffered about 75 per cent casualties and the survivors rallied astride the Thiepval–Grandcourt road, from Hohen Weg and Bulgaren Weg to the Grüne-Feste.

=== French operations ===
Careful planning for the combined attack at Morval was necessary, due to the French Sixth Army advance diverging east and north-east. (Note: Military units after the first one mentioned in this section are French unless specified.) The new attack northwards, to keep touch with the British, needed reinforcements of troops and artillery, which were taken from the Tenth Army further south. Artillery and aircraft were brought from Verdun and XXXII Corps took over on the right of I Corps. The Sixth Army was to advance 3,000 yd (1.7 mi; 2.7 km) close to the line Moislains–Le Transloy. Foch intervened on 25 September, to ensure that I Corps and XXXII Corps attacked north to Sailly-Saillisel, with V Corps as right flank guard. The big attacks on the afternoons of 26 and 27 September took little ground in the face of very heavy German artillery fire. Fayolle concluded that an extensive artillery preparation would be needed before resuming the attack.

== Aftermath ==
=== Analysis ===
German accounts conclude that the break-ins north-west of Courcelette and just east of Thiepval led to the defeat. Lack of reserves forced the 7th Division to retreat in the east and the success of the 11th (Northern) Division allowed Thiepval to be outflanked from the right, with the loss of the village and most of the garrison, the British advancing 1,000–2,000 yd (910–1,830 m) on the 6,000 yd (3.4 mi; 5.5 km) front attacked. The British pushed on in the next few days towards Stuff and Schwaben redoubts, where the Germans were eventually dislodged in the Battle of the Ancre Heights, which began on 1 October. Apart from here and at Sailly-Saillisel in the French Sixth Army area, Bazentin ridge had been captured, giving ground observation of the upper Ancre river and the spurs and valleys on the north bank. The British made better use of their artillery, while German artillery ammunition consumption in September rose to 4.1 million shells from 1.5 million in August but had less effect, much of the ammunition being used inefficiently on unobserved area bombardments, while defensive barrage fire was limited to three-minute periods; up to 25 per cent of the German guns broke down in battle due to mechanical failure.

=== Casualties ===
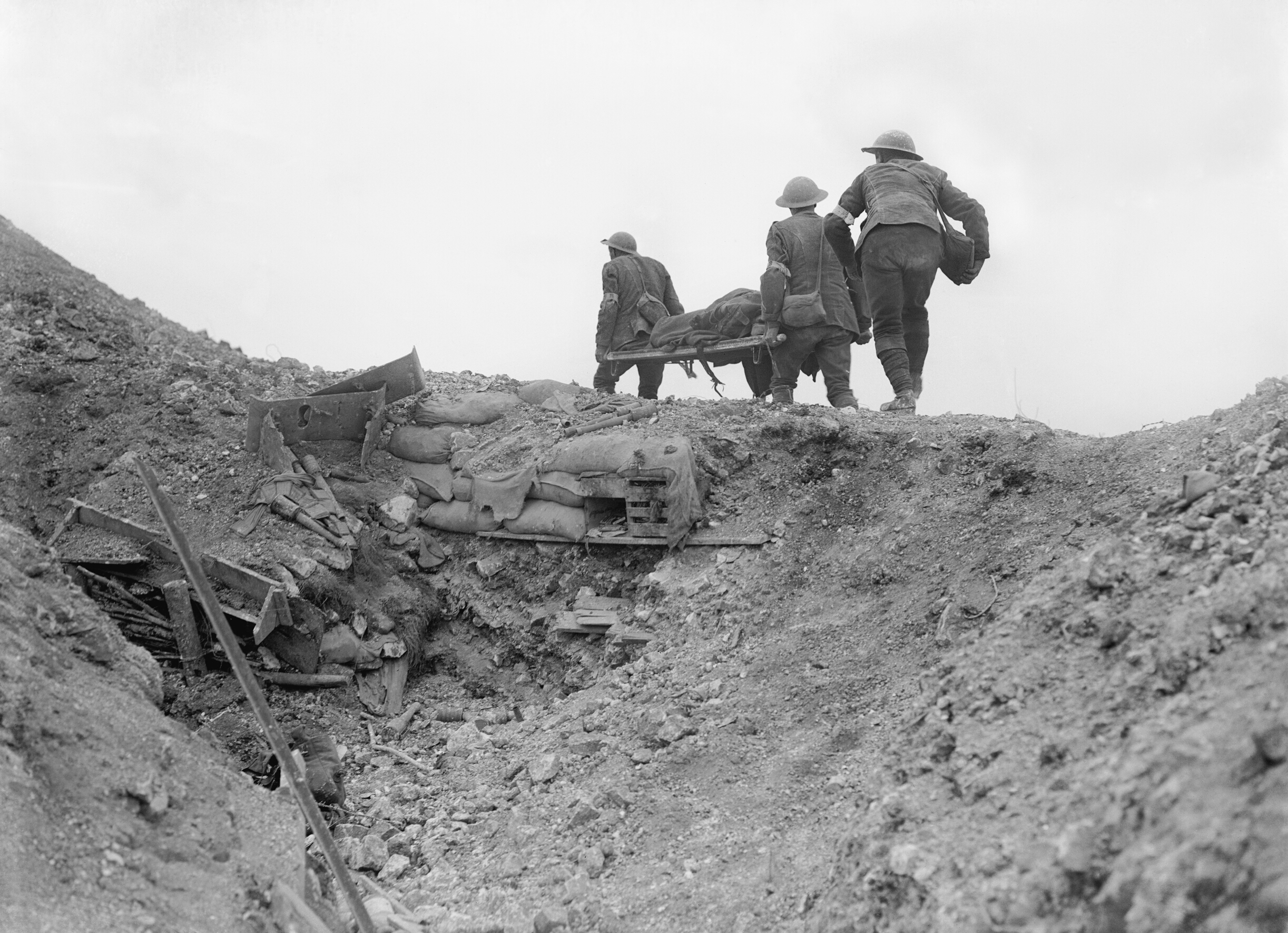
Stretcher bearers during the Battle of Thiepval Ridge, late September 1916

The 1st Canadian Division suffered losses of 6,254 from 1 to 30 September and the 11th (Northern) Division casualties from 26 to 30 September were 3,615 (about 70 per cent of the men being wounded). Casualties in the 18th (Eastern) Division were 4,000. German casualties are uncertain but September is considered to be the most costly month of the battle, with c. 135,000 casualties. The Germans suffered 2,300–2,329 casualties of the c. 10,000 captured by the Reserve Army from 14 to 30 September, along with 27 guns, 200 machine-guns and 40 trench mortars.

=== Subsequent operations ===
British operations concluded on 30 September, with the capture of a large portion of Schwaben Redoubt, north of Thiepval, another first day objective which had been attacked by the 36th (Ulster) Division. In the Battle of the Ancre Heights, which began on 1 October, the final objectives of the Battle of Thiepval were reached; on 14 October the rest of Schwaben Redoubt was captured and the Canadian Corps completed the capture of Regina Trench on 11 November.

== Commemoration ==
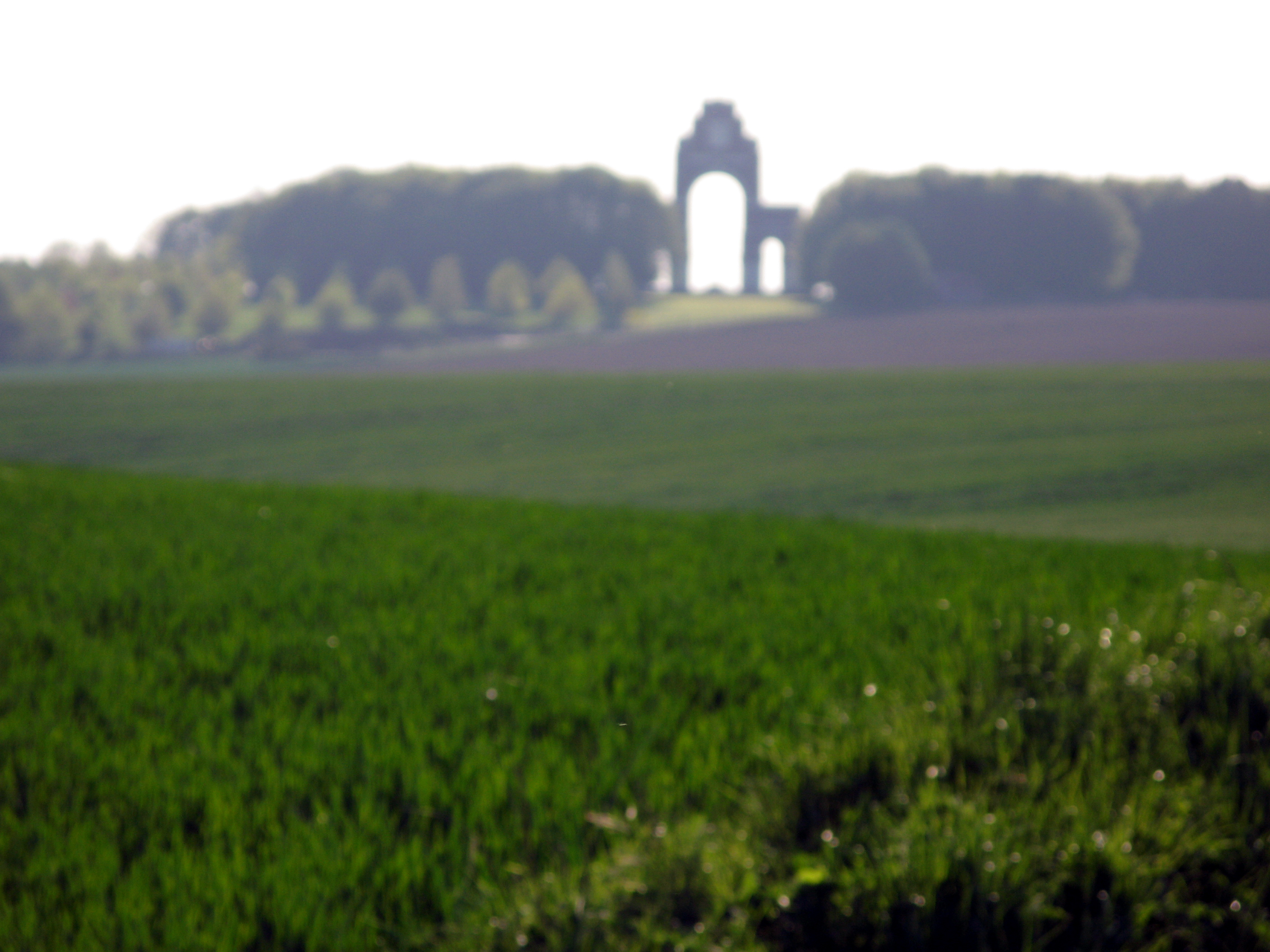
Thiepval mémorial (silhouette floue) 1

Because of the significance that the positions at Thiepval as a first-day objective, which was not captured until almost three months later, the high ground on the point of the Thiepval Spur was selected to be the location of the Anglo-French memorial to the "missing of the Somme". The Thiepval Memorial to the Missing of the Somme is dedicated to the men who were killed and whose bodies were never recovered, during the fighting in the vicinity from 1916 to 1918. The piers of the memorial bear the names of over 72,000 British soldiers, who were killed on the Somme battlefields "but to whom the fortunes of war denied the known and honoured burial given to their comrades in death".

== See also ==
- List of Canadian battles during World War I
- Ulster Tower Thiepval
