= Capture of Schwaben Redoubt =

Incident in the 1916 Battle of the Somme

Schwaben-Feste (Schwaben Redoubt)
- Part of the Battle of the Somme of the First World War
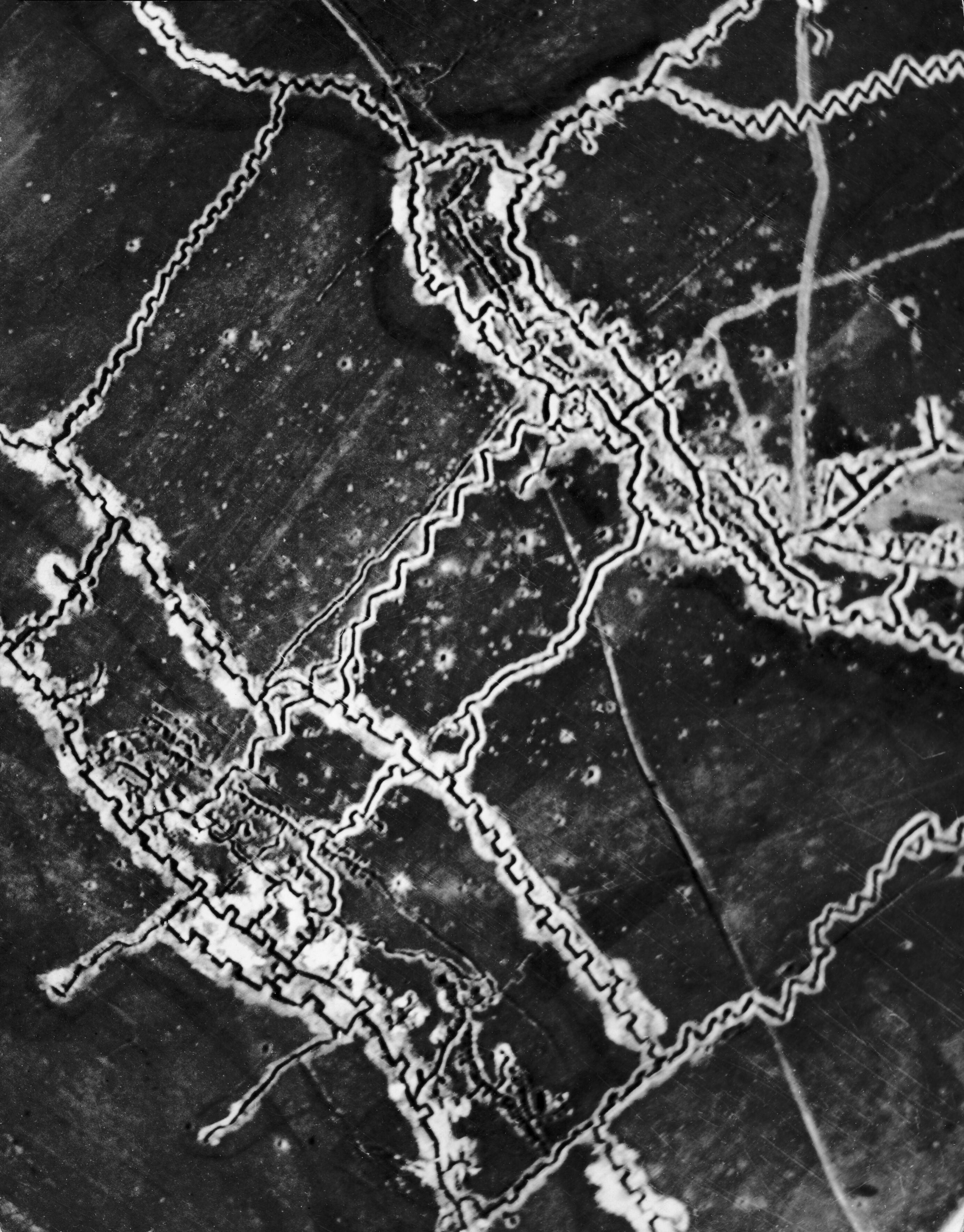
- British aerial photograph of German trenches north of Thiepval; Schwaben Redoubt is the network of trenches in the upper right of the photograph.
Date	1915–1916
Location	Picardy, France 50°03′30″N 02°41′03″E
Result	British victory
Territorial changes	near Thiepval

Belligerents
United Kingdom; France	German Empire

Commanders and leaders
Douglas Haig; Hubert Gough; Joseph Joffre; Ferdinand Foch	Erich Ludendorff; Kronprinz Rupprecht; Fritz von Below

Units involved
Reserve Army/Fifth Army	1st Army

Strength
Parts of 4 divisions	

The Capture of Schwaben Redoubt (Schwaben-Feste) was a tactical incident in the Battle of the Somme 1916, during the First World War. The redoubt was a German strong point 500–600 yd (460–550 m) long and 200 yd (180 m) wide, built in stages from 1915, near the village of Thiepval and overlooking the River Ancre. It formed part of the German defensive system in the Somme sector of the Western Front and consisting of a mass of machine-gun emplacements, trenches and dug-outs. The redoubt was defended by the 26th Reserve Division, from Swabia in south-west Germany, which had arrived in the area during the First Battle of Albert in 1914. Troops of the 36th (Ulster) Division captured the redoubt on 1 July 1916, until forced out by German artillery-fire and counter-attacks after dark.

The British kept the area of the redoubt under bombardment until 3 September, when the 49th (West Riding) Division attacked the area from the west, in a morning fog. The 36th (Ulster) Division infantry got across no man's land but were defeated when German artillery and machine gun-fire swept the Irish troops as German infantry counter-attacked from the flanks, using hand grenades. In late September, the British gained a footing in the redoubt during the Battle of Thiepval Ridge (26–28 September). Attack and counter-attack followed until 14 October, when troops of the 39th Division, captured the last German foothold in the redoubt and repulsed German counter-attacks from 15 to 21 October. The site of the redoubt lies between the Thiepval Memorial and the Ulster Tower.

== Background ==
=== Somme front, 1914–1915 ===
The 26th (Württemberg) Reserve Division (Generalmajor [Major-General] Franz von Soden) of the XIV Reserve Corps (Generalleutnant [Lieutenant-General] Hermann von Stein), arrived on the Somme in late September 1914, attempting to advance westwards towards Amiens. By 7 October, the advance had ended; any cover had been occupied and temporary scrapes improvised. Fighting in the area from the Somme northwards to the Ancre, subsided into minor line-straightening attacks by both sides. The primacy of artillery had been established during the fighting of 1914 and the exploitation of artillery fire power in defensive fighting, required means of communication between the front line and artillery positions in the rear. The command of artillery needed to be centralised to make sure that all guns in range engaged targets. In late December 1915, Major Bornemann, commander of the 26th Division field artillery, wrote a report in which he described failures of communication, which led to an advantage created by the blowing of a mine being squandered by the artillery.

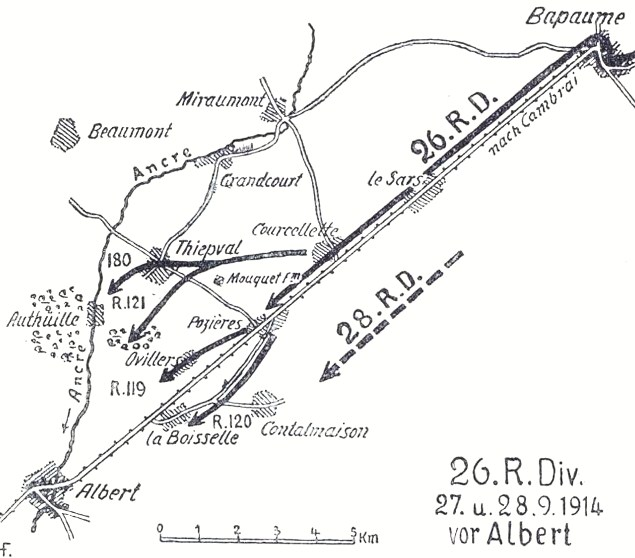
Diagram of the 26th (Württemberg) Reserve Division and the 28th (Baden) Reserve Division attacks towards Albert, late September 1914

Bornemann wrote that artillery battery observation posts had been left unmanned, on the assumption that they had been superseded by artillery liaison officers in the front line. Reporting had been inadequate due to complacency and reports should have been circulated to all headquarters rather than individual officers making assumptions that the information had been communicated. The gunners should avoid settling into routine firing, since prisoners had reported that its predictability made it easy to evade; limiting firing to the area in front of batteries should cease and oblique firing into adjacent sectors begin, to ensure that British artillery could not fire with impunity from the flanks. Concentrations of fire consumed too much ammunition on local targets and should be limited to conserve ammunition for firing on other targets, to disrupt British operations and to reassure German infantry that they would not be abandoned by the artillery.

Retaliatory fire should be prompt and authority to order fire should be shared by all artillery officers, rather than relying on unreliable communications to request authority to fire on targets as they were observed. Bornemann recommended that if a British artillery battery was detected, it should be engaged with 200 rounds immediately. Co-operation with artillery observers in aircraft and balloons should be improved, with at least one target selected for bombardment in every aircraft sortie, for which the artillery commanders should draw up gridded drawings of targets within range. When British aircraft were overhead, battery positions should cease fire to remain hidden and German aircraft units should be contacted to drive the British away. Bornemann suggested that artillery group commanders should have control of all artillery ammunition allotted to the group and that artillery regimental headquarters should be responsible for replacing stocks and passing on demands for more ammunition to higher headquarters.

=== Fortification of the Western Front, 1915 ===
On the Western Front, General Erich Falkenhayn Chief of the General Staff at the Oberste Heeresleitung (OHL, German army high command) instituted a construction plan in January 1915, by which the western armies would create field fortifications built to a common system, intended to economise on infantry, while offensive operations were conducted on the Eastern Front. Barbed-wire obstacles had been enlarged from one belt 5–10 yd (4.6–9.1 m) wide to two belts 30 yd (27 m) wide and about 15 yd (14 m) apart. The front line had been increased from one trench to three, about 150–200 yd (140–180 m) apart, the first trench (Kampfgraben) to be occupied by sentry groups, the second (Wohngraben) to accommodate the front-trench garrison and the third trench in which local reserves would assemble. The trenches were to be traversed and have sentry-posts in concrete recesses in the parapet. Dugouts were to be deepened from 6–9 ft (1.8–2.7 m) to 20–30 ft (6.1–9.1 m), set 50 yd (46 m) apart and be large enough for 25 men each. An intermediate line of strong points (the Stützpunktlinie) designed for all-round defence, about 1,000 yd (910 m) behind the front line was also to be built. Communication trenches were to be dug back to the enlarged reserve line, renamed the second position, which was as well built and wired as the first position. The second position was built beyond the range of opposing field artillery, to force an attacker to stop and move guns and ammunition forward before assaulting the line.

=== Schwaben-Feste ===
Behind the German front line, the ground rose steeply to the west for 1,000 yd (910 m), to the top of Thiepval ridge, 250 ft (76 m) higher than the Ancre valley. Construction of a small network of trenches, known as Schwaben Schanze (Swabian Fieldworks), began on the ridge in early 1915, roughly 2,300 ft (700 m) north of Thiepval, at the northern and highest point on the ridge. About 600 yd (550 m) further back, a second position (the Grandcourt Line to the British), was dug south from Grandcourt to Pozières, with a line of new Festen (redoubts), Sodern, Grallsburg, Alte Württemburg, Staufen and Zollern. Schwabenschanze was developed into Schwaben-Feste (Schwaben Redoubt) and connected to Mouquet Farm by Auwärtergraben, Thiepval wood by Teufelsgraben and to Thiepval village by Martinspfad. The redoubt dominated Thiepval, the ground to the south and St Pierre Divion to the north-west. With Stuff and Pommiers redoubts, the Germans had observation in all directions and garrisons which could reinforce the front line or deliver a counter-attack.

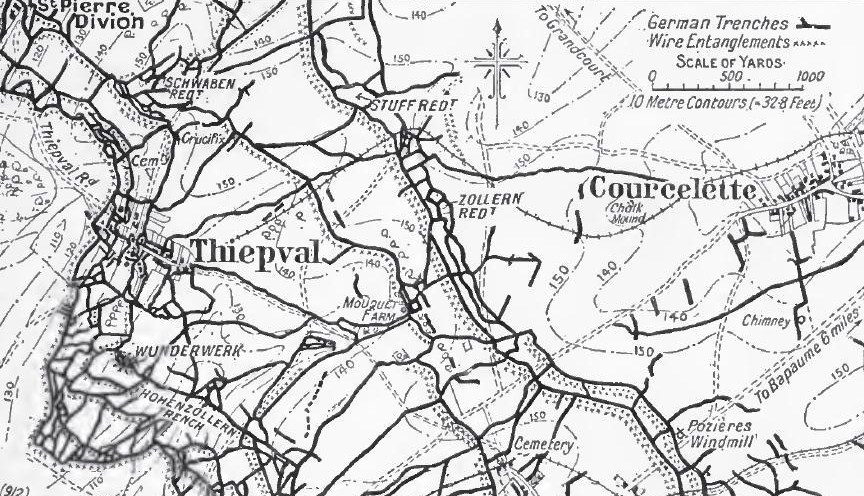
Map of German defensive fortifications, from Thiepval to Courcelette, July 1916

Schwaben Redoubt had deep dugouts for accommodation with several entrances each, a battalion command post, first aid post, signalling station and strong points, with three heavy machine-guns and four light machine-guns. Many of the dug-outs were on the perimeter, at trench junctions (clockwise from north, using the English names), Irwin Trench (strong points 49 and 69), Lucky Way (strong point 27), Stuff Trench, Hessian Trench (strong point 45), Martin's Lane, the Strasburg Line (strong point 19) and Clay Trench (strong point 99). Inside the redoubt, along an inner trench on the south-west face, were strong points 65, 37 and 39. Beyond the south-west face, in the maze of trenches towards Thiepval to the south and St Pierre Divion to the north-west, were nine more strong points. The redoubt was triangular, with an extension to the east across the Thiepval–Grandcourt road and had a frontage of around 1,600 ft (500 m). At the end of July 1915, fresh troops were observed moving into the French positions north of the Somme, opposite Reserve Infantry Regiment 99 (RIR 99) and on 1 August, were identified at Thiepval Wood as British soldiers ("dressed in brown suits"). Lessons learned during the battles in Artois and at the Battle of Hébuterne near Serre in 1915 and at the Battle of Verdun in 1916, were incorporated into new defensive works as the signs of a British offensive on the Somme front multiplied. (Note: From 7 to 13 June 1915, the French Second Army attacked a German salient on a 1.2 mi (1.9 km) front at Toutvent Farm near Serre, against the 52nd Division and gained 3,000 ft (900 m) on a 2 km (1.2 mi) front, leaving a salient known as the Heidenkopf north of the Auchonvillers–Beaumont Hamel road, at a cost of 10,351 casualties, 1,760 being killed; German casualties were c. 4,000.)

== Prelude ==
=== German preparations ===
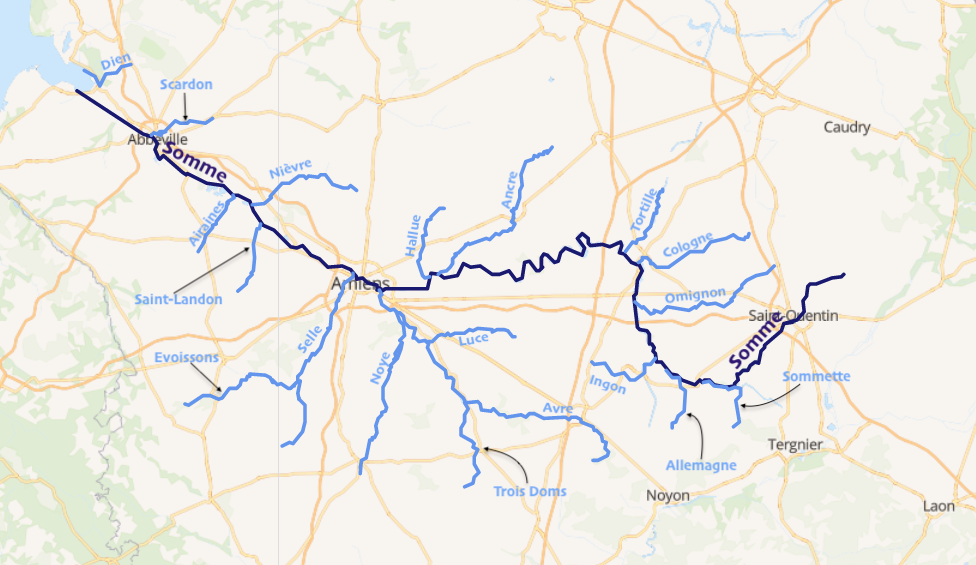
Somme river basin, showing tributaries, including the Ancre

More fortifications were built, especially in the intermediate, second and third positions, near the Schwaben and Grallsberg redoubts. New battery positions were built to accommodate artillery reinforcements, dugouts were deepened and extra exits were added. Engineers sited and designed new trenches and stringently inspected the building work performed by the infantry. In early March 1916 and from 15 to 19 May, the chief engineer of the 2nd Army inspected the first position in the area of the 26th Reserve Division; only in the area of Reserve IR 119 at Beaumont Hamel and the trenches to the west around Hawthorn Ridge Redoubt, were there enough shell-proof concrete posts. By July 1916, the German front line from Thiepval to St Pierre Divion was obstructed by sixteen rows of barbed wire and the second line lay behind five rows. Shell-proof dug outs 30 ft (9.1 m) deep, could accommodate all of the trench garrison.

=== British preparations ===
Weather (23 June – 1 July 1916)
Date	Rain mm	Temp (°F)	
23	2.0	79°–55°	wind
24	1.0	72°–52°	dull
25	1.0	71°–54°	wind
26	6.0	72°–52°	dull
27	8.0	68°–54°	dull
28	2.0	68°–50°	dull
29	0.1	66°–52°	dull wind
30	0.0	72°–48°	dull high wind
1	0.0	79°–52°	fine

In the British front sector allocated to X Corps (Lieutenant-General Thomas Morland) at Thiepval, the Royal Engineers dug a series of Russian saps into no man's land, ready to be opened at Zero Hour and allow the British infantry to attack the German positions from a comparatively short distance away. Russian saps in front of Thiepval were the work of 179th Tunnelling Company, which also prepared such saps further south at Ovillers and La Boisselle. In the X Corps section allocated to the 36th (Ulster) Division (Major-General Oliver Nugent), ten Russian saps were dug from the British lines into no-man's land, north-east of Thiepval Wood; each of the tunnels housed two mortars.

Field artillery support was to come from the 36th (Ulster) divisional artillery, part of the 49th (West Riding) divisional artillery and a regiment of French guns. A large number of heavy guns under the command of X Corps was also to fire on the 36th (Ulster) Division front. The preliminary bombardment of five days' duration was extended by two more, due to wet weather and observers reported that the German wire was well cut. After a hurricane bombardment for 65 minutes, a lifting bombardment was planned to fall on the German lines in succession, from A to A1 at zero hour, A1 to B three minutes after zero and from the B Line to a line 400 yd (370 m) back 18 minutes after zero hour. The jump to the C Line, would occur after 28 minutes and the final lift to the D Line, 98 minutes after zero hour. After standing until 198 minutes after zero hour, to enable the 107th Brigade to assemble, the barrage would jump to a line 300 yd (270 m) east of the D Line. Field artillery would "walk" up communication trenches during each lift and Stokes mortars were to join in the hurricane bombardment as medium and heavy mortars bombarded strong points. The French artillery was to participate in the wire-cutting bombardment and then fire gas shells into the Ancre valley.

=== British plan ===
On the south bank of the Ancre, the 36th (Ulster) Division objective was set at the fifth line of German trenches, known as the D Line, with the right flank at sector D 8. The ground rose in a convex slope to the top of Bazentin Ridge, towards Schwaben Redoubt and a series of parallel trenches, from the B Line to the C Line. The attack front was divided into two sections south of the Ancre, to be attacked by the 109th Brigade on the right and the 108th Brigade on the left. The 109th Brigade was advance with two battalions to capture the A Line (the German front line), the immediate support trench (A1) and then the B Line, before moving on to the Grandcourt–Thiepval road and consolidating. Two reserve battalions were to occupy the A and B Lines, when the advanced battalions had reached the final objective. The 108th Brigade was to capture the A and B Lines and then dig in along the C Line at the north-east corner of Schwaben Redoubt, with a detachment posted as a flank guard to the left and to send a party northwards, to observe the ground along the Grandcourt–St Pierre Divion road, as two platoons advanced along the A and B Lines to St Pierre Divion. The attack on the D Line was to be made by the 107th Brigade with three battalions. The attacking battalions were to advance in eight waves at 50 yd (46 m) intervals and the 107th Brigade was to advance in artillery formation until resistance was met.

== Battle ==
=== 1 July ===
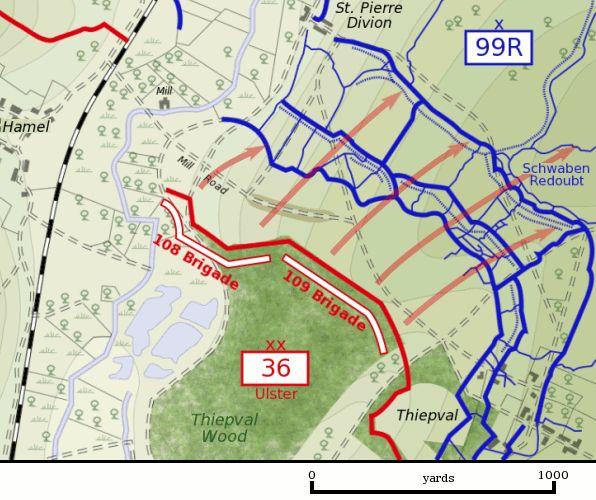
The British attack of 1 July 1916. Schwaben Redoubt is at centre right.

At 7:15 a.m., four hours after dawn, the Irish troops formed up in no man's land, most along the sunken Thiepval–Hamel road, obscured by the bombardment and smoke screens on the flanks and moved to within 150 yd (140 m) of the German front trench. The artillery and mortar bombardment lifted off the front trench at 7:30 a.m. and the Irish advanced steadily, crossing the front trench with few losses but then the German counter-barrage fell on the rear of the first line and the support companies. As soon as the British guns stopped, machine-gun fire from Thiepval cemetery swept the support battalions as they moved forward and fire from Beaucourt Redoubt across the Ancre, caught the third support battalion on the left flank. The foremost infantry pressed on, reached the B Line at 7:48 a.m. and took a large number of prisoners but German troops emerged from dugouts in the A Line behind the 108th Brigade, where the moppers-up had been killed by machine-gun fire. The leading waves continued to advance and reached the C Line and the corner of Schwaben Redoubt at 8:48 a.m. The supporting battalion survivors had occupied their objectives but cross-fire from German machine-guns then prevented movement.

Reserve IR 99 of Reserve Infantry Brigade 52, holding the line north of Thiepval, was broken through and the attackers rushed Schwaben Redoubt around 8:00 a.m. The garrison, a support company standing by to reinforce the front defences, was surprised and surrendered after brief resistance. The centre battalion of RIR 99 had been destroyed in the breakthrough and 500 men taken prisoner. An attack towards the Grandcourt Line ran into the British barrage, then fell back to Schwaben Redoubt and the Hansalinie which ran from the redoubt down the north edge of the ridge to the Ancre. The left hand battalion of RIR 99 had repulsed the attack on Thiepval but the centre and right, from the village to the Ancre south of St Pierre Divion, had been broken through, most of the troops having been trapped underground and taken prisoner. Observers in the Grandcourt Line were unable to see the breakthrough and over-running of the redoubt and the Hansalinie because of smoke and dust in the air. Only when the Irish advanced on the Grandcourt Line, was the identity of the troops visible in the area discovered. As soon as the British bombardment lifted, the only reserves nearby, the recruit battalion of IR 180 and a machine-gun company, occupied the Grandcourt Line around Thiepval.

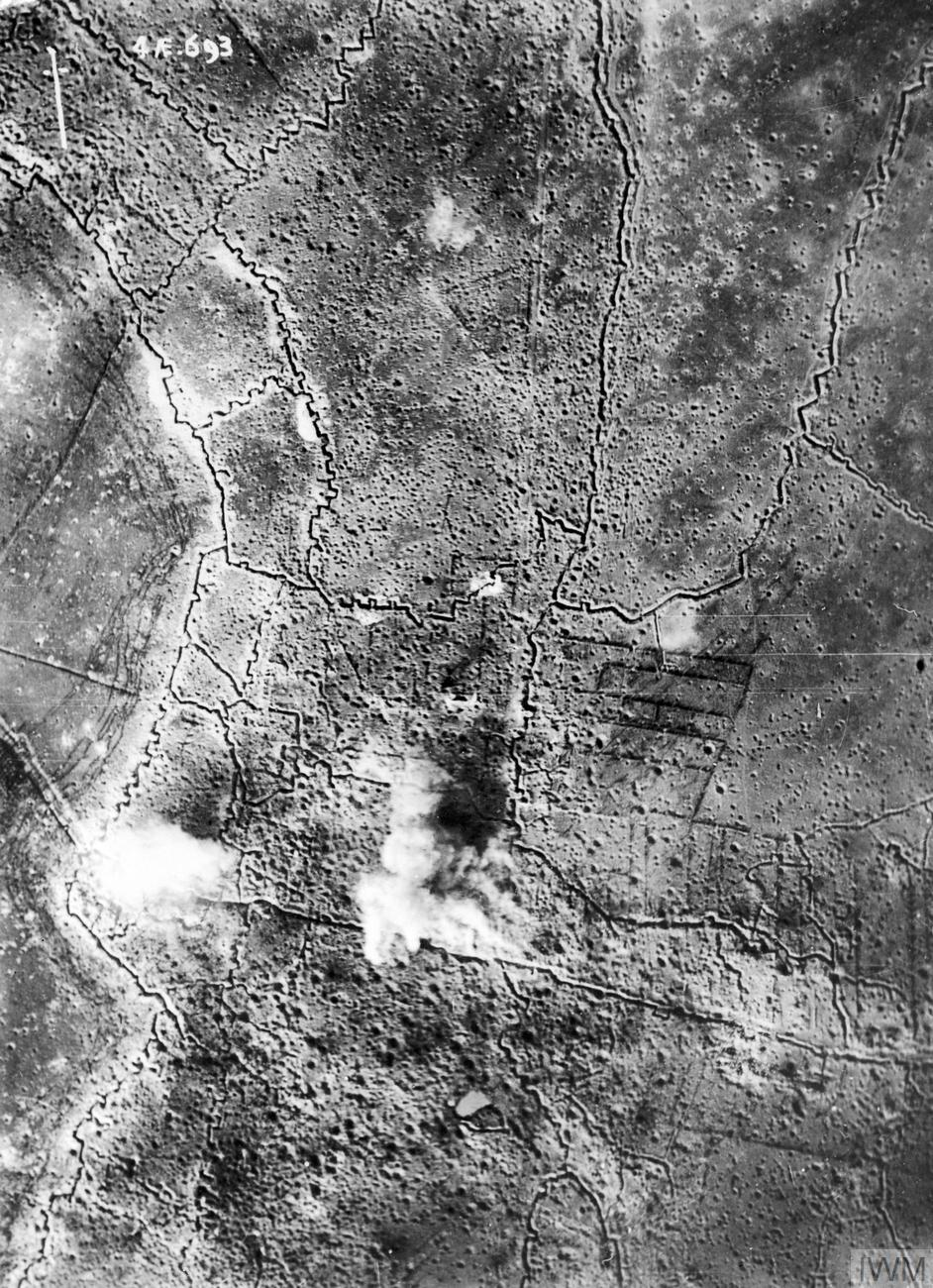
Aerial photograph of Thiepval under bombardment, 1916 (IWM Q 63740)

The 107th Brigade advanced to the A Line but the 10th Royal Irish Rifles on the right, had to pass through machine-gun fire from front, right flank and right rear, which caused many casualties. By 10:00 a.m. runners had reported the fall of the C Line, eight minutes before the advance to the D Line was due to begin. Because of the defeats of the 32nd Division on the right flank at Thiepval and the VIII Corps divisions on the north bank of the Ancre, Nugent tried to get permission from X Corps headquarters to cancel the 107th Brigade attack on the D Line. Nugent was over-ruled, as new attacks were being arranged on the flanks; about 45 minutes later X Corps HQ ordered the advance to stop until the situation on the flanks was clearer. The stop order failed to reach the 107th Brigade, because telephone lines had been cut and runners were shot down crossing no man's land. The brigade advanced for about 1,000 yd (910 m) in a "wild and desperate venture", before the survivors were repulsed from the objective by German troops in the D Line (Grandcourt Trench). German attacks on the left flank from St Pierre Divion, were forced back several times, by the remaining men of the three battalions on the left flank; on the right flank, the Mouquet Switch trench was reconnoitred and found empty.

An attack from the east face of Schwaben Redoubt was met by machine-gun fire but a party of about fifty men reached an artillery position in a fold known as Artilleriemulde (Boom Ravine), in front of the Grandcourt Line. Other groups got into the line further south, where it was unoccupied. By 10:00 a.m. the breakthrough on the 26th Reserve Division front had made Thiepval vulnerable to an attack from the redoubt, which would make the village untenable. Soden ordered General Auwäter, commander of Reserve Infantry Brigade 52, to recapture the redoubt and sent a battalion of Bavarian Reserve Infantry Regiment 8 (BRIR 8) as reinforcements. Auwäter ordered the counter-attack to begin immediately by three groups, from the north-east, east and south-east, to forestall a wheeling movement against Thiepval and Ovillers. Delays caused to message runners by the British bombardment, held back the counter-attack until 4:00 p.m. 4 Squadron RFC observed the attack of the 36th (Ulster) Division beyond the German front line, where it was out of view from the British lines. At 2:00 p.m., a 4 Squadron observer reported that German artillery from Grandcourt to Courcelette, was moving to the rear and at 4:30 p.m., that there was no sign of German troops massing against the redoubt. After an hour, the 36th (Ulster) Division was reported to still hold The Crucifix, to the south-east of the redoubt.

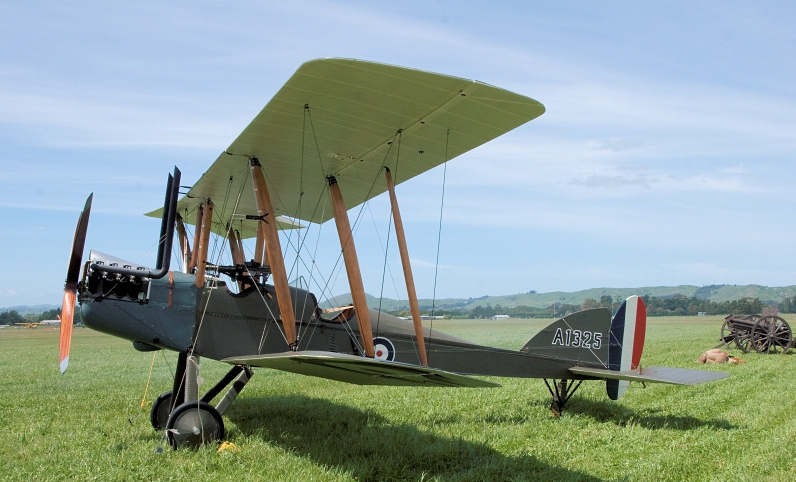
B.E.2f A1325 (2009)

Two companies of pioneers tried to dig a communication trench across no man's land but at 2:00 p.m. the attempt was abandoned, which left parties carrying supplies no alternative but to stop or be annihilated as they crossed no man's land in the open. Supplies ran out on the German side and German counter-attacks began on the right flank, at Schwaben Redoubt and The Crucifix, despite an accurate flank barrage from the French artillery. The 146th Brigade of the 49th (West Riding) Division attacked Thiepval at 3:00 p.m. but stopped after the leading battalion was shot down. A German counter-attack then began on the left flank and was equally visible to the British, who destroyed the attack with Lewis guns and artillery. At 4:00 p.m., two of the 146th Brigade battalions were ordered to Schwaben Redoubt to reinforce the Irish, who were being forced slowly back by counter-attacks but the leading battalions had been committed to the Thiepval attack and the other two were in the 32nd Division front line. At 7:18 p.m., six companies advanced towards the C Line but were forced back by machine-gun fire.

The three recruit companies of IR 180 advanced in lines, from Grandcourt, along the lower slopes of the ridge, to the Hansalinie and then began to bomb up the line towards Schwaben Redoubt. The Irish troops in Artilleriemulde were overrun and captured or killed. In the centre, the counter-attack began from Staufen-Feste (Stuff Redoubt), with three companies of BRIR 8 but was promptly engaged by British artillery and forced under cover. The advance was continued along Hessen Weg, which led from Courcelette to Thepval and then moved into the open opposite the south-eastern corner of Schwaben Redoubt. The fourth company of the battalion, had been intended to move along Hessen Weg, so joined the other three companies. By 6:00 p.m., troops in the original front line near St Pierre Divion, had bombed southwards and recovered some of the captured front line. The advance up the Hansalinie had reached the north face of the redoubt and then been repulsed, during an attempt rush the redoubt.

By 7:00 p.m. another rush on the south-eastern corner, by IR 180 had failed and more piecemeal attacks from all round the redoubt were driven off, with many casualties. Messages were sent back to the 26th Division headquarters for a bombardment and at 9:00 p.m., the divisional artillery began to fire on the redoubt, from the north-east to the south-east for one hour. The German infantry attacked again, supported by two battalions of IR 185, which had arrived from reserve at Beugny at about 10:00 p.m. and attacked from Stuff and Zollern redoubts. In costly hand-to-hand fighting, the Germans recaptured the redoubt in about thirty minutes, finding it strewn with about 700 Irish dead. By midnight the ridge had been re-occupied and two more battalions of IR 180 had arrived and moved to the Hansalinie and the redoubt, available to reinforce the front line from Thiepval to the Ancre.

=== 3 September ===
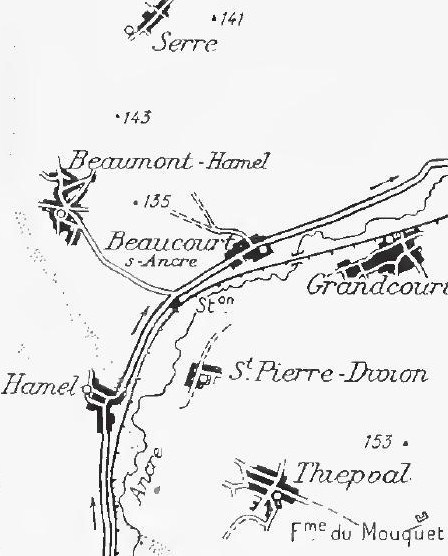
Ancre front, 1916

The Reserve Army kept up a continuous bombardment on the Thiepval–St Pierre Divion area after 1 July, which reduced the German field defences to wreckage and the defenders dispersed among shell-holes and the surviving dug-outs. On 3 September, the British attacked along the Ancre river despite poor weather, to gain strictly limited objectives in the Anzac and II Corps sectors, east of Thiepval. On the left of II Corps, the 49th (West Riding) Division (Brigadier-General Goring-Jones), was to capture two lines of trenches on a 1,000 yd (910 m) front. The infantry attack began at 5:13 a.m., from the Hamel–Thiepval road behind a creeping barrage, as the heavy artillery bombarded positions to the south-east, Schwaben Redoubt and the Strasburg Line. Few casualties were suffered during the advance over no man's land and the two 147th Brigade battalions took the German front line and then reached the support trench. Direction was lost and one battalion missed the Pope's Nose salient; isolated groups of Germans held out in parts the front line. Machine-gun fire from III Battalion, IR 66 of the 52nd Division, which had just relieved III Battalion, IR 180 at Schwaben Redoubt and the Strasburg Line, swept the British attackers and then both battalions counter-attacked with bombing parties from both battalions.

The 146th Brigade on the left, was caught by machine-gun fire from the Pope's Nose and the right-hand battalion failed to reach the German front trench. The left-hand battalion reached the front trench but was not able to reach the support trench. Visual signalling failed in the mist and few runners got through the German standing barrage, which left the situation at the front unclear, until stragglers began to appear. By 7:30 a.m., the survivors of the 146th Brigade had returned to the British front line. On the right, the infantry of the 147th Brigade defended the German front trench until they ran out of hand grenades and then dribbled back, until about 10:00 p.m. A second attack was planned but the retreat of the 147th Brigade led to a postponement and when the state of the attacking battalions, which had lost 1,200 casualties became known, the attack was cancelled. IR 66 spent 5–13 September digging new shelters in Schwaben Redoubt but failed to conceal the work and British artillery maintained a slow bombardment by super-heavy artillery, which could demolish even the deepest dug-outs.

=== 28 September – 14 October ===
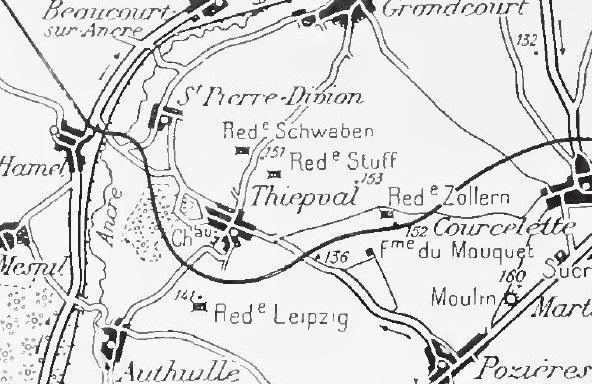
Capture of Thiepval and advance on "Schwaben Redoubt", September–October 1916

The area to the right (east) of Schwaben Redoubt was attacked by the 53rd Brigade of the 18th (Eastern) Division during the Battle of Thiepval Ridge (26–28 September). The 8th Suffolk captured Schwabengraben (Schwabian Trench) in a few minutes and after a ten-minute halt, advanced to Zollern Trench by 1:15 p.m., meeting troops of the 54th Brigade north of Thiepval. The advance towards the redoubt was stopped after 250 yd (230 m), by small arms fire from the front and flanks and the troops retired after dark. Attempts on the left to bomb forward during the evening also failed. The 54th Brigade was to capture the west end of Thiepval and advance about 0.5 mi (0.80 km) to Schwaben Redoubt. The battalion on the right captured the east end of Thiepval and the left hand battalion managed to get halfway through the west end of the village. A third battalion sent forward as a reinforcement, was severely bombarded by German artillery as it moved forward and the survivors dug in with the leading battalions, just ahead of the village on the right; the attack on Schwaben Redoubt was postponed.

On 28 September, the 53rd Brigade formed up for the attack, on tapes facing north-west from Zollern Trench, the left-hand battalion to capture the redoubt. The advance began at 1:00 p.m. and easily captured Bulgar Trench. The Midway Line held out for longer but the area east of redoubt was approached by 2:30 p.m. On the left, the 7th Queen's advance on the redoubt, drifted to the left but managed to get into the southern face of the redoubt and take fifty prisoners. The battalion also managed to take the south-west corner, then attempted to attack to the north but was stopped and established a barricade. By 5:00 p.m., all of the south face had been captured and the troops were ordered to dig in. The capture of the south face of Schwaben Redoubt was observed by the crews of RFC contact patrols and artillery observation aircraft directed artillery-fire, which destroyed 16 gun pits, damaged fifteen and destroyed nine ammunition pits. Poor weather restricted flying on 29 September but the next day was bright and low-flying sorties discovered that most of the Schwaben Redoubt had been captured.

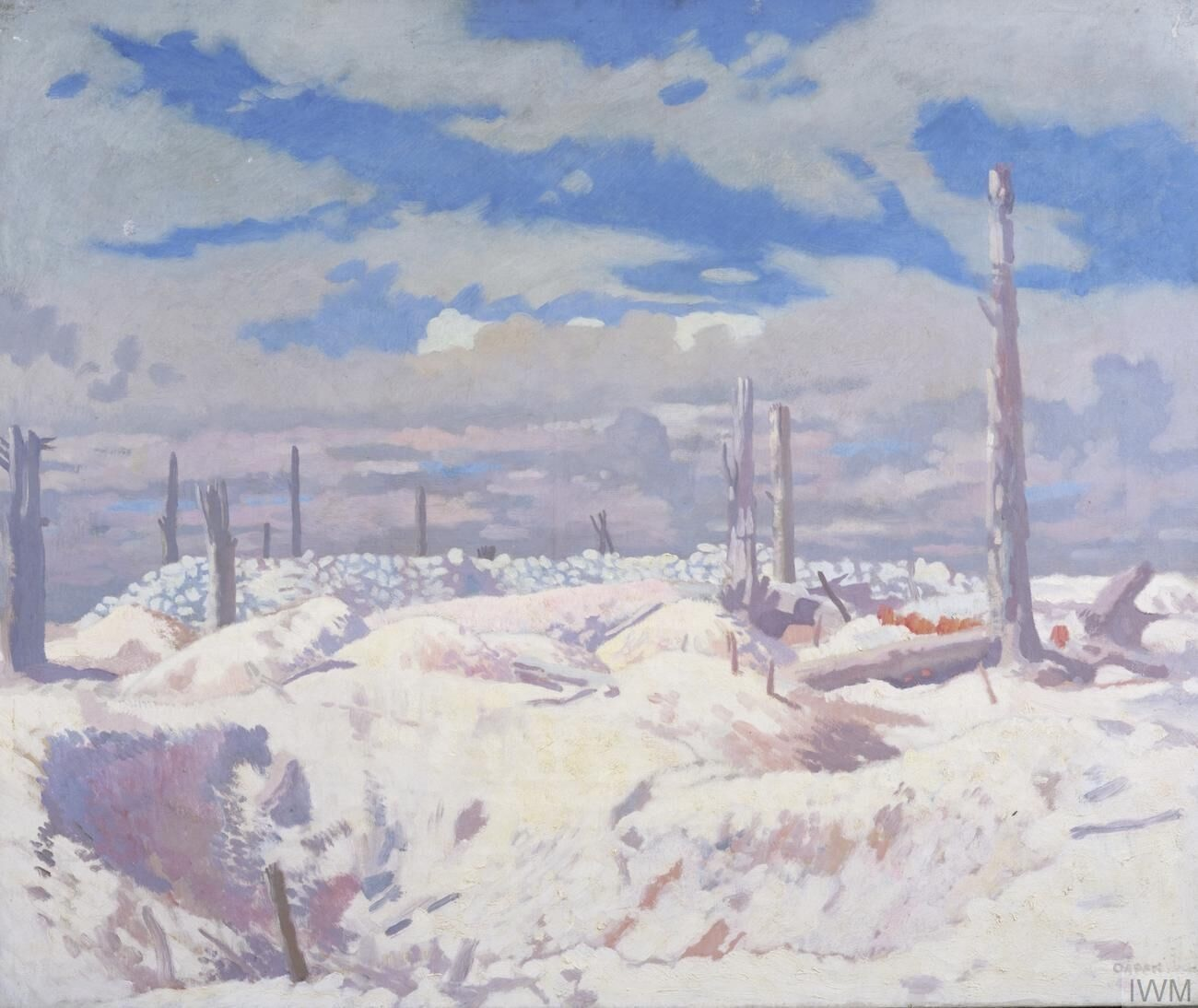
"Schwaben Redoubt" by William Orpen (IWM Art.IWM ART 3000)

On 29 September, the British positions in the redoubt had been consolidated and the 7th Queen's relieved. Next day, the 8th East Surrey was counter-attacked and forced out of the redoubt, until a bayonet attack restored the position but the west face was lost by the 7th West Kents. At 4:00 p.m., the East Surreys attacked the northern face and took the objective but the attack up the west face was repulsed. A German counter-attack from the west at 9:00 p.m., forced the defenders of the north face back to the Stuff Trench junction. The 55th Brigade in the Schwaben Redoubt, was attacked by II Battalion, IR 66 at 5:15 a.m. on 2 October, which gained a small area after a bombing fight had lasted all day. Both sides resumed bombing on 4 October, with no advantage gained by either side. Next day, the 8th Norfolks, tried a converging attack on the rest of the redoubt at 10:00 a.m., through deep mud which impeded movement and no ground was gained.

In early October, the 39th Division took over from the 18th Division. Attacks by RIR 110 of the 28th Reserve Division, which had relieved the 26th Reserve Division, were made from 7 to 8 October. The German attacks were supported by Flammenwerfer detachments and repulsed by two 117th Brigade battalions. At 4:30 a.m., the 16th Sherwood Foresters made a surprise attack over ground, on the northern face beyond the crest, as the trenches had filled with mud but the Germans were waiting and repulsed the attack. On 14 October, the 4th/5th Black Watch, the 1st Cambridge and the 17th King's Royal Rifle Corps of the 117th Brigade, attacked the north side of the redoubt. The troops advanced over the open and captured the last part of the redoubt by 11:00 p.m., taking about 150 prisoners of II Battalion, RIR 110. Three German counter-attacks on 15 October, supported by Flammenwerfer detachments were defeated. A German attack on Schwaben Redoubt, early on 21 October was repulsed and a British attack planned for the afternoon caught the Germans while still disorganised. Observers from 4 Squadron and 7 Squadron RFC watched the attack and directed artillery fire on German guns with zone calls, intended to suppress as much German artillery as possible rather than to destroy just a few guns. (Note: Zones were based on lettered squares of the army 1:40,000 map; each map square was divided into four sections of 3,000 sq yd (2,500 m^{2}). The observer used a call sign of the map square letter then the zone letter, to signal to the artillery. All guns and howitzers up to 6 in (150 mm) that were in range, opened rapid fire using corrections of aim from the air observer.)

== Aftermath ==
=== Analysis ===
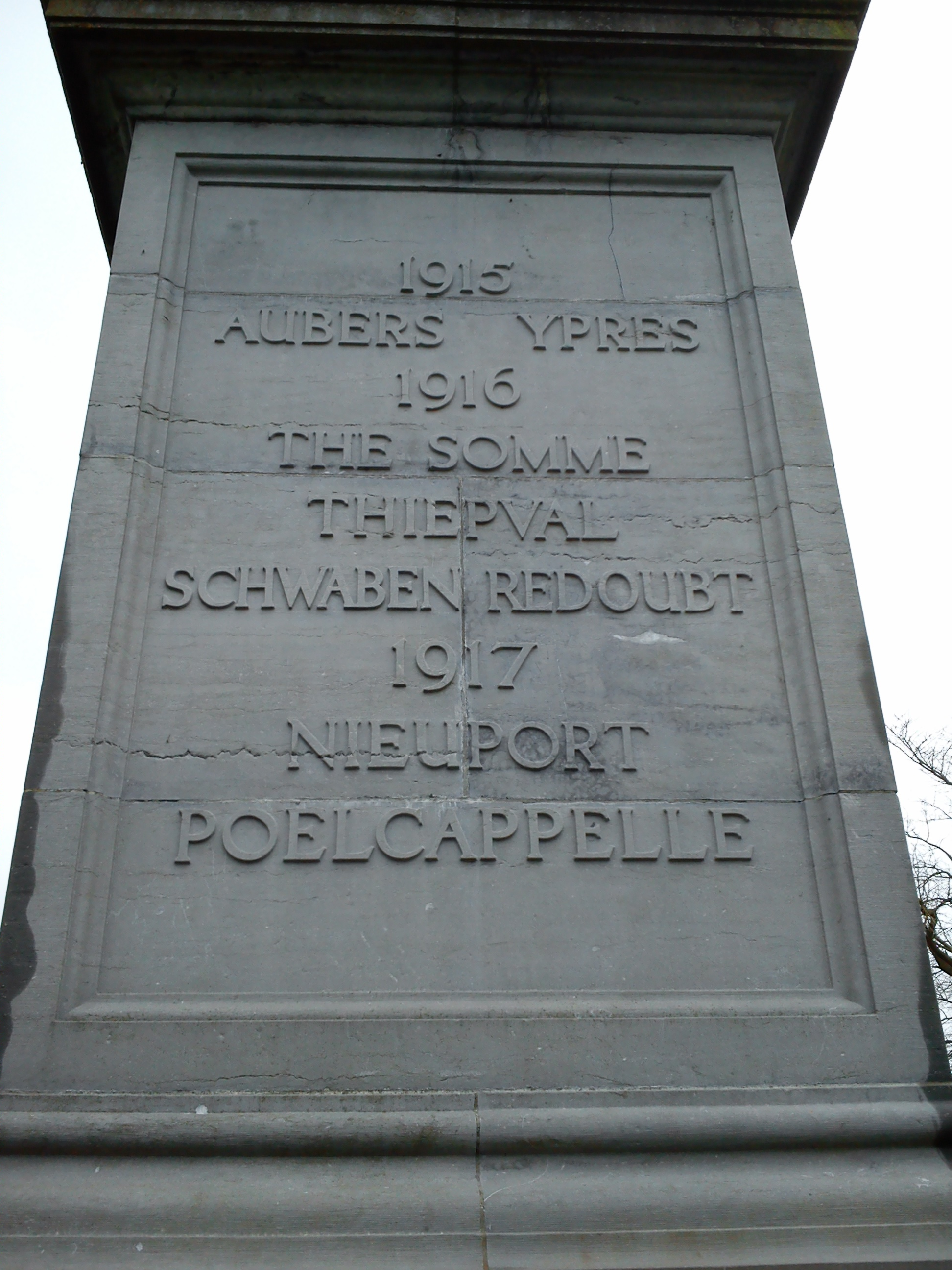
References to Thiepval and Schwaben Redoubt on the 49th Infantry Division Memorial near Ypres

The German defences opposite the 36th (Ulster) Division had been more severely damaged than positions further south. Front line trenches had been demolished, barbed wire had been swept aside and dug outs caved in, which caused the 9th Company of III battalion, RIR 99 many casualties. The British advanced too quickly for the German machine-gunners to fire for long before they were overrun. Communications on the German side broke down but news of the breakthrough reached Soden quickly from Beaucourt Redoubt on the north bank of the Ancre. II Battalion, Bavarian Reserve Regiment 8 (BRIR 8) at Irles, 5 mi (8.0 km) north-east of Thiepval was ordered to counter-attack but did not receive the order until 9:00 p.m. The Brigade commander had already ordered all troops in the area to attack from Goat Redoubt and Grandcourt and then Oberstleutnant Bram, the commander of BRIR 8 arrived. In the confusion the counter-attack could not be co-ordinated and began piecemeal, with units joining in as they came up. The concentrated bombardment from 9:00 to 10:00 p.m. demolished the remnants of the redoubt and soon after the infantry attacked, the remaining British troops retreated.

Artillery support for the 3 September attack was excellent but lack of surprise and the dominating position of Schwaben Redoubt made success unlikely. The 49th (West Riding) Division troops were tired and had been sent partly trained replacements, said to have had low morale. Some of the replacements were so inexperienced that they thought that they were being ordered to walk into German artillery-fire, rather than follow the British creeping barrage. German analysis of the defeat at Thiepval during the Battle of Thiepval Ridge, ascribed the British success to the defeat of RIR 77 and 153 east of the village, which led to the village defences being outflanked. The British had been able to push up to Schwaben Redoubt by bombing forward with hand grenades. Major-General Arthur Wauchope, the historian of the Black Watch, wrote,

The attack on the 14th was a soldier’s battle. At the beginning of the fight nearly all of the officers of the attacking companies were either killed or wounded, and it says much for the grit and endurance of the men that the 4/5th never wavered; it carried its attack forward with great gallantry and determination, hung on for hours under heavy German shell fire, repelled all enemy counter-attacks and, finally, having consolidated the captured position, handed it over intact to the relieving platoons of A Company.

=== Casualties ===
On 1 July, the 36th (Ulster) Division suffered 5,104 casualties and the 49th (West Riding) Division suffered 590. By the time the 49th (West Riding) Division was relieved by the 25th Division on 19 August, its casualties had risen to 5,175. The attack of 3 September cost the 25th Division more than 1,200 casualties. Casualties suffered by the 18th (Eastern) Division during the capture of the redoubt, except the north-west corner from points 19 to 69, were 1,990 men and the division estimated German casualties at 2,500, including 237 prisoners.
