= Plowden =

Plowden may refer to:

- Plowden, Shropshire, village in Shropshire, England

== People with the surname Plowden ==
- Alfred Chichele Plowden (1844–1914), English barrister and court magistrate
- Alison Plowden (1931–2007), English historian and biographer
- Anna Plowden (1938-1997), archaeological conservator
- Bridget Plowden, Lady Plowden (1910–2000), English educationist, reformer
- David Plowden (born 1932), American photographer
- Dorothea Plowden (died 1827), British songwriter and librettist
- Edmund Plowden (1518–1585), English lawyer, legal scholar and theorist
- Edmund Plowden (colonial governor) (1590–1659), explorer and colonial governor
- Edwin Plowden, Baron Plowden (1907–2001), English industrial and public servant
- Francis Plowden (politician) (c.1644–1712), English Jacobite official
- Francis Peter Plowden (1749–1829), English barrister and writer.
- Francis Plowden (British Army officer) (1851–1911), British general
- Francis Plowden (businessman) (born 1945), lay member of the U. K. Judicial Appointments Commission
- Henry Plowden (1840-1920), English cricketer
- Luke Ishikawa Plowden (1995), Japanese-American actor
- Robert Plowden (1740–1823), English Jesuit priest
- Thomas Plowden (1594–1664), English Jesuit priest, translator
- Walter Plowden (1820–1860), British consul in Ethiopia
- William Plowden (Conservative politician) (1787–1880), English politician
- William Chichele Plowden (1832–1915), Member of the Legislative Council in India, British Member of Parliament
- William Julius Lowthian Plowden (1935–26 June 2010) was a British political science academic and government advisor.

== See also ==
- Plowden Report (named after Bridget Plowden)
- Plowden Hall
