= Francis Plowden =

Francis Plowden may refer to:

- Francis Plowden (politician) (c.1644–1712), English Jacobite official
- Francis Plowden (barrister) (1749–1829), English Jesuit, barrister and writer
- Francis Plowden (British Army officer) (1851–1911), British general
- Francis Plowden (businessman) (born 1945), British businessman
