= Alban Church of England Academy =

Location
- Silver Street; Bedford, Bedfordshire, MK44 3HZ; England; 52.15498°N 0.35123°W

Information
- Type: Academy
- Religious affiliation: Church of England
- Established: 1977 (2011 as an academy)
- Closed: 2018
- Department for Education URN: 136550 Tables
- Ofsted: Reports
- Head teacher: C. Chipperton
- Gender: Mixed
- Age: 9 to 13
- Enrolment: 490
- Capacity: 480
- Website: http://www.albanacademy.co.uk/

Alban Church of England Academy (formerly Alban Church of England Middle School) was a mixed middle school located in Great Barford, Bedfordshire, England.

Pupils began attending Alban Middle School in the September 1976 after Bedfordshire County Council decided to implement the three-tier education system of lower, middle and upper schools across the county (as recommended in the 1967 Plowden Report). The school was officially opened in June 1977 by the then Bishop of St Albans, the Right Reverend Robert Runcie. The school was the first purpose-built voluntary aided middle school opened in Bedfordshire by the Church of England Diocese of St Albans. The name of the school was subsequently changed by the school governors to Alban Church of England Middle School to reflect this link.

On 1 April 2011 the school was converted to academy status and was renamed Alban Church of England Academy, becoming independent of local authority control. The Diocese of St Albans was the sponsor of the academy.

In January 2016, the school attracted attention from news media after warning that pupils without a packed lunch or £2.10 payment, would not be given a hot meal, but bread and butter only. This was if the pupil's guardian couldn't be reached, and if the pupil had no other provision in place. The decision came after the school reported having to reimburse catering company Caterlink for 100 unpaid meals in a single month. The policy was not implemented after backlash from parents led to then head teacher Sue Lourensz apologising for "any offence" caused.

In July 2018, Alban Church of England Academy shut its doors for the last time, after the decision was made to close the school due to the county reverting to the two-tier education system. The school essentially merged with next-door Great Barford Lower School to become Great Barford Primary Academy, consolidating on the former Alban site.
