= William Plowden =

William Plowden may refer to:

- William Plowden (Conservative politician) (1787–1880), English politician and Conservative Member of Parliament
- William Julius Lowthian Plowden (1935–2010), academic at the London School of Economics, first Director-General of the Royal Institute of Public Administration
- William Chichele Plowden (1832–1915), civil servant; Member of the Legislative Council in India; Liberal Member of Parliament
