= General Burton =

General Burton may refer to:

- Benjamin Burton (British Army officer) (1855–1921), British Army major general
- Edmund Burton (born 1943), British Army lieutenant general
- Jefferson S. Burton (fl. 1980s–2020s), U.S. Army major general
- Napier Christie Burton (1758–1835), British Army general
