= Percival Spearman Wilkinson =

British Army general

Major-General Sir Percival Spearman Wilkinson KCMG CB
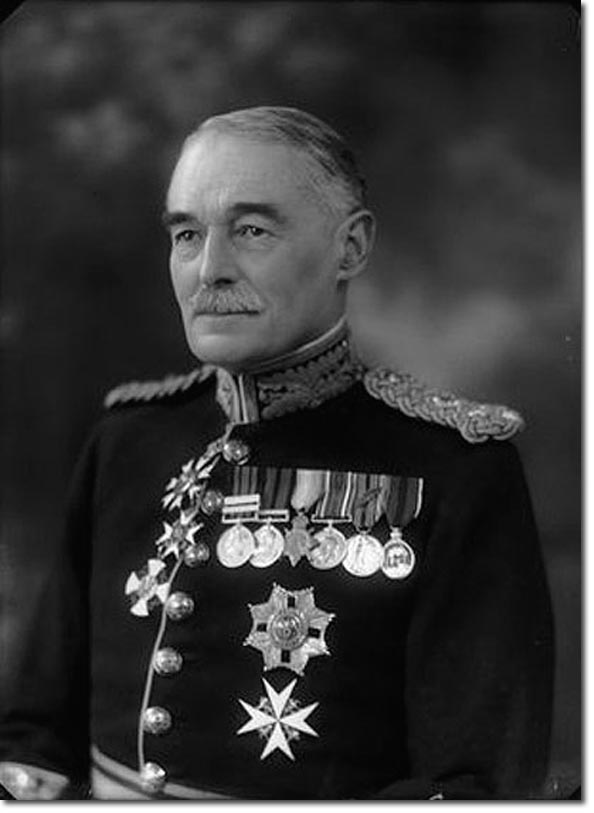
- Born: 5 July 1865; Mount Oswald, County Durham, England
- Died: 4 November 1953 (aged 88)
- Relatives: Sir Henry Wilkinson (uncle)
- Military career
- Allegiance: United Kingdom
- Branch: British Army
- Service years: 1883–1923
- Rank: Major-General
- Unit: Northumberland Fusiliers
- Commands: 1st Secunderabad Infantry Brigade (1912–1914); 50th (Northumbrian) Division (1915–1918)
- Conflicts: First World War
- Awards: Knight Commander of the Order of St Michael and St George; Companion of the Order of the Bath

Major-General Sir Percival Spearman Wilkinson KCMG CB (5 July 1865 – 4 November 1953) was a British Army officer who served as colonel of the Northumberland Fusiliers from 1915 to 1935 and commanded the 50th (Northumbrian) Division for over two years during World War I.

== Early life ==
Percival Spearman Wilkinson was born in County Durham in July 1865. He received his formal education at Uppingham School, Rutland, a prestigious public school.

== Early military career ==
Unlike many of his future contemporaries, Wilkinson did not attend the Royal Military College, Sandhurst. Instead, his military career began when he commissioned as a lieutenant into the 3rd (Militia) Battalion, Northumberland Fusiliers (later the Royal Northumberland Fusiliers), on 10 November 1883. He transferred to the Regular Army on 28 April 1886.

He was promoted to captain in January 1895. He was seconded for service with the Colonial Office in October 1897 and "served in West Africa on operations on the Niger" and received promotion to brevet major in July 1899.

In 1900 he served "on operations in Ashanti, where he was wounded". He was promoted to major, on augmentation, in July 1900, was made a brevet lieutenant colonel in January 1901, a brevet colonel in February 1904, and, upon being made a substantive colonel and temporary brigadier general in September 1909, became inspector general of the Royal West African Frontier Force at the same time.

Promoted to major general on 8 August 1912, he served as general officer commanding (GOC) of the 1st Secunderabad Infantry Brigade, part of the 9th (Secunderabad) Division, on internal security duties in India, taking over command from Major General Francis George Bond in November 1913. He was appointed a Companion of the Order of the Bath (CB) and Companion of the Order of St Michael and St George (CMG) in January 1914 in the 1914 New Year Honours.

== First World War ==
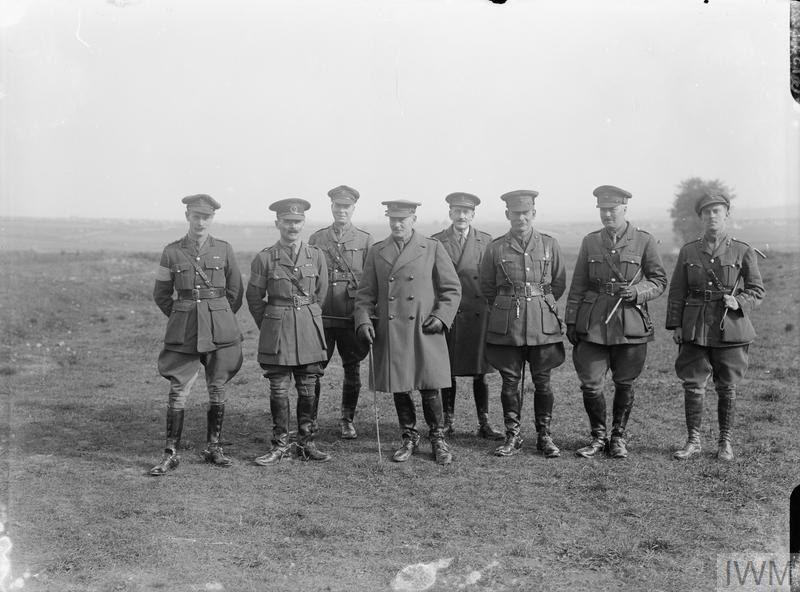
Major General Wilkinson, GOC 50th Division, with one of his brigade commanders, probably commanding the 149th (Northumbrian) Brigade, and officers of the Northumberland Fusiliers, near Millencourt, France, October 1916.

The outbreak of the First World War, which began in the summer of 1914, saw him still in India and as GOC of the brigade, an appointment he relinquished in October when he returned to Britain. In January 1915 he was appointed colonel of his regiment, the Northumberland Fusiliers, a prestigious role he would hold for the next two decades.

In June 1915 and was appointed to command the Troops at Shorncliffe before sent to the Western Front in August to take command of the 50th (Northumbrian) Division, a Territorial Force (TF) formation, taking over from Major General The Earl of Cavan.

Wilkinson led the division throughout the Battle of the Somme in 1916. Under his command, the division was committed to the line in July and participated in the major set-piece attacks at the Battle of Flers–Courcelette, the Battle of Morval, and the Battle of Le Transloy. The next major engagement for Wilkinson and his division was the Battle of Arras in April 1917, by which time they were serving in General Sir Edmund Allenby's Third Army. It was on 13 April, a Friday, during the early stages of the battle, near Arras itself, where Wilkinson was wounded. According to the division's diary:

Major-General P. S. Wilkinson, C.B. C.M.G., while up in the line visiting Brigade H.Q. was hit with a piece of shell in the leg; causing considerable contusion.

Despite the injury, he refused evacuation and remained at duty with his division.

Soon afterwards, Wilkinson found himself involved in a unique incident in British military history. Alongside two other fellow divisional commanders—Henry de Beauvoir de Lisle of the 29th Division and Philip Robertson of the 17th (Northern) Division—Wilkinson protested directly to the commander-in-chief (C-in-C) of the BEF, and Allenby's superior, Field Marshal Sir Douglas Haig. The three men, at "considerable risk to their careers and in defiance of the traditions of their service", convinced Haig that Allenby had "utterly misunderstood what Haig wanted" and that the Third Army commander had "ploughed on with an intensified mass offensive" with "calamitous" results. As a result, Haig "suspended all operations in the Arras sector" on 15 April. Unusually, neither Wilkinson nor his fellow generals received any reprimand.

His conduct during these operations led to his CMG being upgraded to a Knight Commander of the Order of St Michael and St George (KCMG) in June "for services rendered in connection with Military Operations in the Field", making him Sir Percival.

In February 1918, after a two-and-a-half-year tenure in command, Wilkinson was relieved of his post by Lieutenant-General Sir Aylmer Hunter-Weston, his corps commander, GOC VIII Corps. Historian Simon Robbins has characterized this removal as unjustified, attributing it to a perceived lack of aggression, despite Wilkinson's long record of leading from the front. Command of the 50th went to the much younger Major General Henry Jackson.

Following his removal, he returned to Britain and was appointed inspector of Musketry in March 1918.

== Post-war and final years ==
Upon relinquishing this assignment in June 1919, he returned to command 50th (Northumbrian) Division as a peacetime formation in the UK in July 1919 before he retired from the army on 4 July 1923. In retirement he was chief commissioner of the St. John Ambulance. He ceased to belong to the reserve of officers in July 1932.

Having been made colonel of the Northumberland Fusiliers (soon to be the Royal Northumberland Fusiliers) twenty years earlier, he relinquished this position in July 1935, when Major General William Norman Herbert succeeded him.

He died on 4 November 1953 at the age of 88.

== Bibliography ==
- Davies, Frank; Maddocks, Graham (2014) [1995]. Bloody Red Tabs: General Officer Casualties of the Great War 1914–1918. Leo Cooper. ISBN 978-1-78346-237-7.
- James, Lawrence (1993). Imperial Warrior. The Life and Times of Field Marshal Viscount Allenby 1861–1936. London: Weidenfeld & Nicolson. ISBN 978-0297811527.
- Perry, F.W. (1993). Order of Battle of Divisions Part 5B. Indian Army Divisions. Newport: Ray Westlake Military Books. ISBN 1-871167-23-X.
- Robbins, Simon (2005). British Generalship on the Western Front. Abingdon: Routledge. ISBN 0-415-40778-8.

Military offices
Preceded by The Earl of Cavan	GOC 50th (Northumbrian) Division; 1915–1918	Succeeded by Henry Jackson
Preceded by Henry Jackson	GOC 50th (Northumbrian) Division; 1919–1923	Succeeded by Frederick Dudgeon
Honorary titles
Preceded by Sir George Bryan Milman	Colonel of the Northumberland Fusiliers; 1915–1935	Succeeded by Sir William Norman Herbert
