= Henry Jackson (British Army officer) =

British Army officer

General Sir Henry Jackson KCB CMG DSO
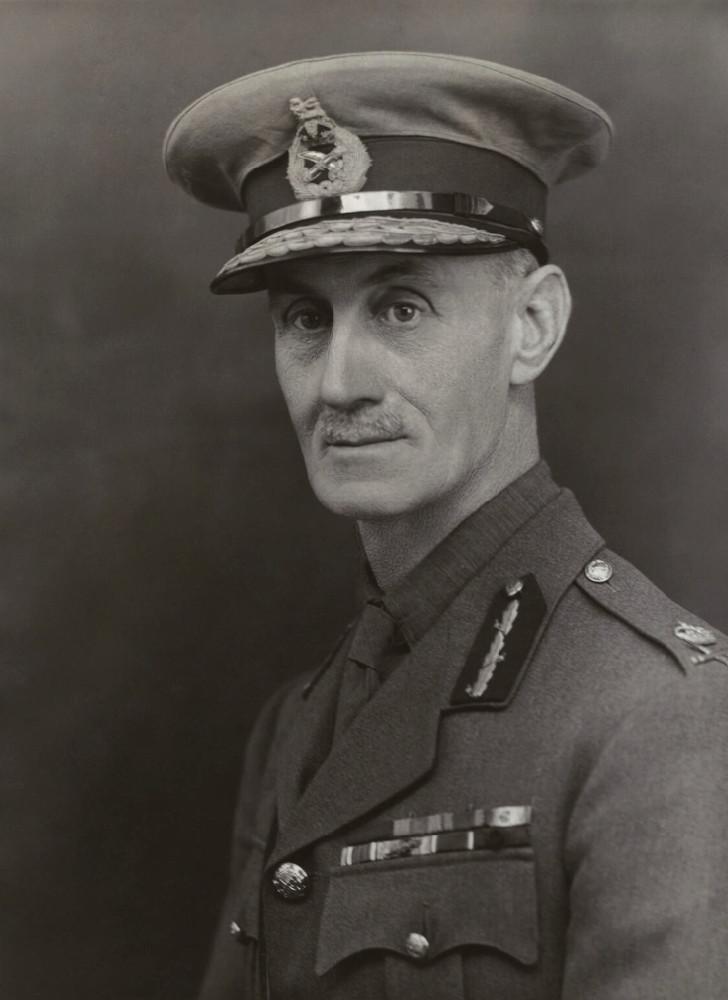
- Jackson in 1935
- Born: 12 August 1879
- Died: 19 October 1972 (aged 93)
- Military career
- Allegiance: United Kingdom
- Branch: British Army
- Service years: 1899–1939; 1940
- Rank: General
- Service number: 14063
- Unit: Bedfordshire Regiment
- Commands: Western Command (1936–1939; 1940); 2nd Division (1931–1935); Small Arms School (1926); 5th Infantry Brigade (c. 1919–1920); 50th (Northumbrian) Division (1918–1919)
- Conflicts: First World War; Second World War
- Awards: Knight Commander of the Order of the Bath; Companion of the Order of St Michael and St George; Distinguished Service Order; Mentioned in Despatches

General Sir Henry Cholmondeley Jackson, KCB, CMG, DSO (12 August 1879 – 19 October 1972) was a British Army officer who achieved high office in the 1930s.

== Military career ==
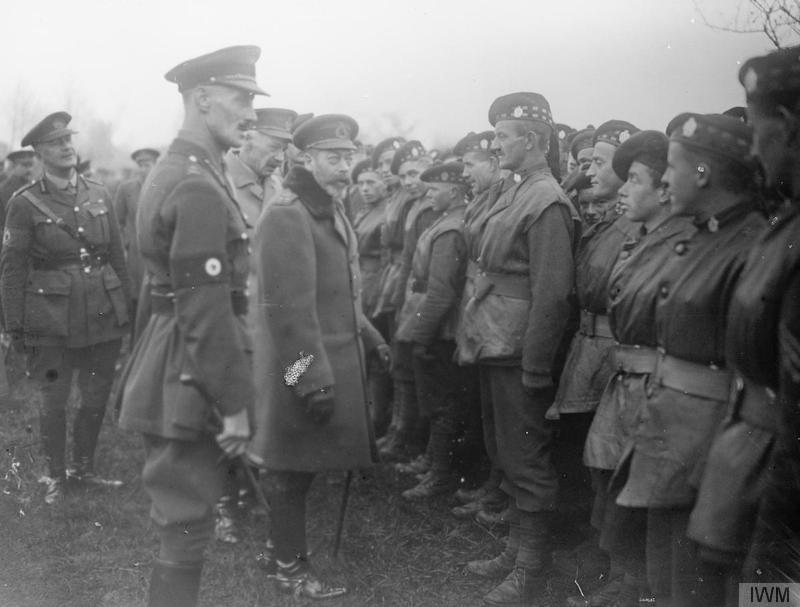
King George V inspecting the 13th (Scottish Horse) Battalion, Black Watch on the Maubeuge-Avesnes road. With the King are General Sir Henry Rawlinson, Major General Henry Cholmondeley Jackson and Brigadier General Percy M. Robinson.

Jackson was commissioned into the 3rd (Militia) battalion of the Loyal North Lancashire Regiment on 14 February 1898, and transferred to the regular army as a second lieutenant in the 1st Bedfordshire Regiment on 4 January 1899.

He was promoted to lieutenant on 23 February 1900, captain in November 1906 and then became adjutant at the Mounted Infantry School at Longmoor in 1908.

After being made a brigade major in September 1915, he became general officer commanding 50th (Northumbrian) Division on the Western Front in April 1918 during the First World War.

After the war Jackson, who on 1 January 1919 was promoted to brevet colonel. and on 2 June to substantive colonel, became commander of the 5th Infantry Brigade from 1919, and then commandant at the Machine Gun School at Netheravon from 1924 before moving on to become director of military training at Army Headquarters in India in 1926.

Promoted in August 1930 to major general, he became general officer commanding 2nd Division in 1931. He was promoted again, this time to lieutenant general, in June 1935 and became general officer commanding-in-chief of Western Command in 1936 before retiring in 1939.

Jackson was colonel of the Bedfordshire and Hertfordshire Regiment from 1935 to 1948.

== Family ==
In 1919, Jackson married Dorothy Nina Seymour (1882–1953), one of five children of General Lord William Frederick Ernest Seymour and his wife, Lady Eva (née Eva Anna Caroline Douglas-Pennant). Dorothy Seymour served with the Voluntary Aid Detachment and British Red Cross Society during the First World War. She gained the rank of junior commander between 1939 and 1942 in the Auxiliary Territorial Service. She died on 7 January 1953, aged 70.

Military offices
| Preceded by Sir Percival Wilkinson | GOC 50th (Northumbrian) Division; 1918–1919 | Succeeded by Sir Percival Wilkinson |
| Preceded by Alan John Hunter | Commandant of the Small Arms School; March–August 1926 | Succeeded by Arthur McNamara |
| Preceded by Thomas Cubitt | GOC 2nd Division; 1931–1935 | Succeeded by Archibald Wavell |
Honorary titles
| Preceded by Rudolph Lambart, 10th Earl of Cavan | Colonel of the Bedfordshire and Hertfordshire Regiment; 1935–1958 | Succeeded by Sir Reginald Denning |
Military offices
| Preceded by Sir Walter Kirke | GOC-in-C Western Command; 1936–1939 | Succeeded by Sir Robert Haining |
| Preceded by Sir Robert Haining | GOC-in-C Western Command; May–June 1940 | Succeeded by Sir Robert Gordon-Finlayson |
