= Frederick Hammersley (British Army officer, born 1858) =

British Army general

Major-General Frederick Hammersley CB
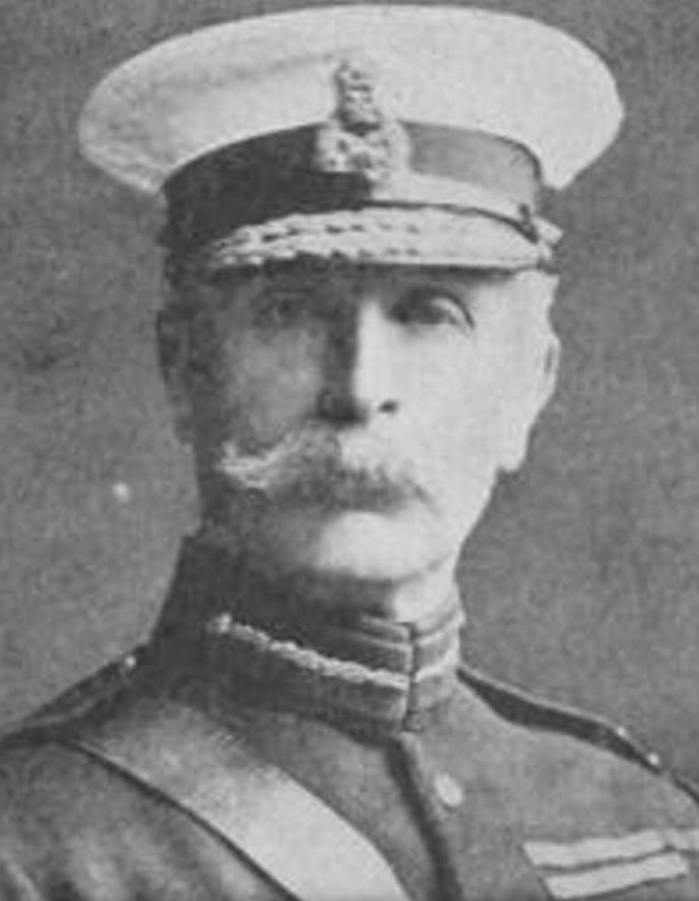
- Born: 21 October 1858; Cork, Ireland
- Died: 28 March 1924 (aged 65) Guernsey, Channel Islands
- Allegiance: United Kingdom
- Branch: British Army
- Rank: Major General
- Commands: 3rd Infantry Brigade; Northumbrian Division; West Lancashire Division; 11th (Northern) Division
- Conflicts: Nile Expedition; Second Boer War; First World War
- Awards: Companion of the Order of the Bath

Major General Frederick Hammersley, CB (21 October 1858 – 28 March 1924) was a senior British Army officer, most often remembered as being the commander of the 11th (Northern) Division during the Gallipoli campaign of the First World War.

== Early military career ==
Hammersley was the son of Major-General Frederick Hammersley (1824–1902) and Sarah Mary Ann Keating (1826–1922). He joined the British Army and was commissioned a lieutenant in the 20th Regiment of Foot on 11 September 1876.

He first saw service in the Nile Expedition of 1884–85 in the Sudan, was promoted to captain on 2 February 1885, received the brevet rank of major on 15 June 1885, and was confirmed in this rank on 9 September 1897. He fought at the Siege of Khartoum in 1898, and was present during the occupation of Crete later the same year, before being deployed to South Africa in 1899 to fight in the Second Boer War. He held a staff appointment as deputy assistant adjutant general (DAAG) in Natal, and on 20 October 1899 was severely wounded at the Battle of Talana Hill. He was promoted to lieutenant colonel on 3 February 1900, and at the same time appointed in command of the 4th Battalion of his regiment, now known as the Lancashire Fusiliers, stationed at Chatham, which he commanded in South Africa.

Serving at the time as an assistant adjutant general (AAG), Hammersley was promoted to temporary brigadier general in December 1905. Reverting to his substantive rank of colonel, he was placed on half-pay in October 1907, before being promoted once again to temporary brigadier general and appointed to command the 3rd Infantry Brigade in January 1908, taking over from Major General William Pitcairn Campbell. He was made a Companion of the Order of the Bath (CB) in June that year, and continued to command his brigade, then serving in Aldershot Command, but was relieved of his position due to repeatedly showing signs of shell shock.

Instead, having been promoted to major general in May 1910, he became general officer commanding (GOC) of the Northumbrian Division of the Territorial Force (TF) in September 1911, after its previous commander, Major General Francis Plowden, had died.

== First World War ==
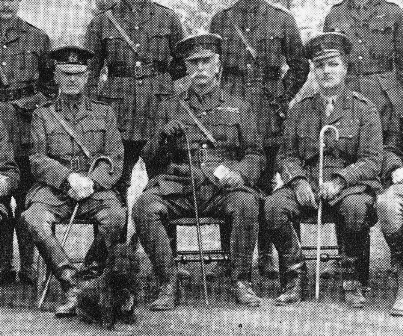
Major General Frederick Hammersley, GOC 11th (Northern) Division, with some of his staff.

Despite his shell shock, upon the outbreak of the First World War in the summer of 1914, he was put in command of West Lancashire Division, another TF formation, in August 1914 and shortly thereafter of the newly formed 11th (Northern) Division, part of Kitchener's volunteer army.

In this capacity, Hammersley commanded the landing at Suvla Bay by his division during the Gallipoli campaign of 1915–1916. However, his ability to oversee such an operation was subsequently called into question, and the Dardanelles Commission openly criticised his command. The orders given by Hammersley were deemed to be confused and the work of his staff defective.

On 23 August 1915, he was removed from the front-line in a state of collapse and was replaced as GOC of his division by Major General Edward Fanshawe, who had been sent from the Western Front. He was invalided back to England, suffering from battle fatigue. Field Marshal Lord Kitchener had warned that he should be watched to ensure that "the strain of trench warfare is not too much for him".

He was then made deputy inspector general of the lines of communication.

Military offices
Preceded by Francis Plowden	GOC Northumbrian Division; 1911–1912	Succeeded by Benjamin Burton
Preceded by Walter Lindsay	GOC West Lancashire Division; August 1914	Succeeded by John Forster
Preceded by New post	GOC 11th (Northern) Division; August 1914 - August 1915	Succeeded by Edward Fanshawe
