= Walter Lindsay =

British Army Officer

Major-General Sir Walter Lindsay KCB DSO
- Born: 15 May 1855; London, United Kingdom
- Died: 7 March 1930 (aged 74); London, United Kingdom
- Military career
- Allegiance: United Kingdom
- Branch: British Army
- Rank: Major-General
- Commands: West Lancashire Division
- Conflicts: Second Boer War; First World War
- Awards: Knight Commander of the Order of the Bath; Distinguished Service Order

Major-General Sir Walter Fullarton Lodovic Lindsay KCB DSO (15 May 1855 – 7 March 1930) was a British Army officer who was a senior figure in the Royal Artillery during the First World War.

== Military career ==
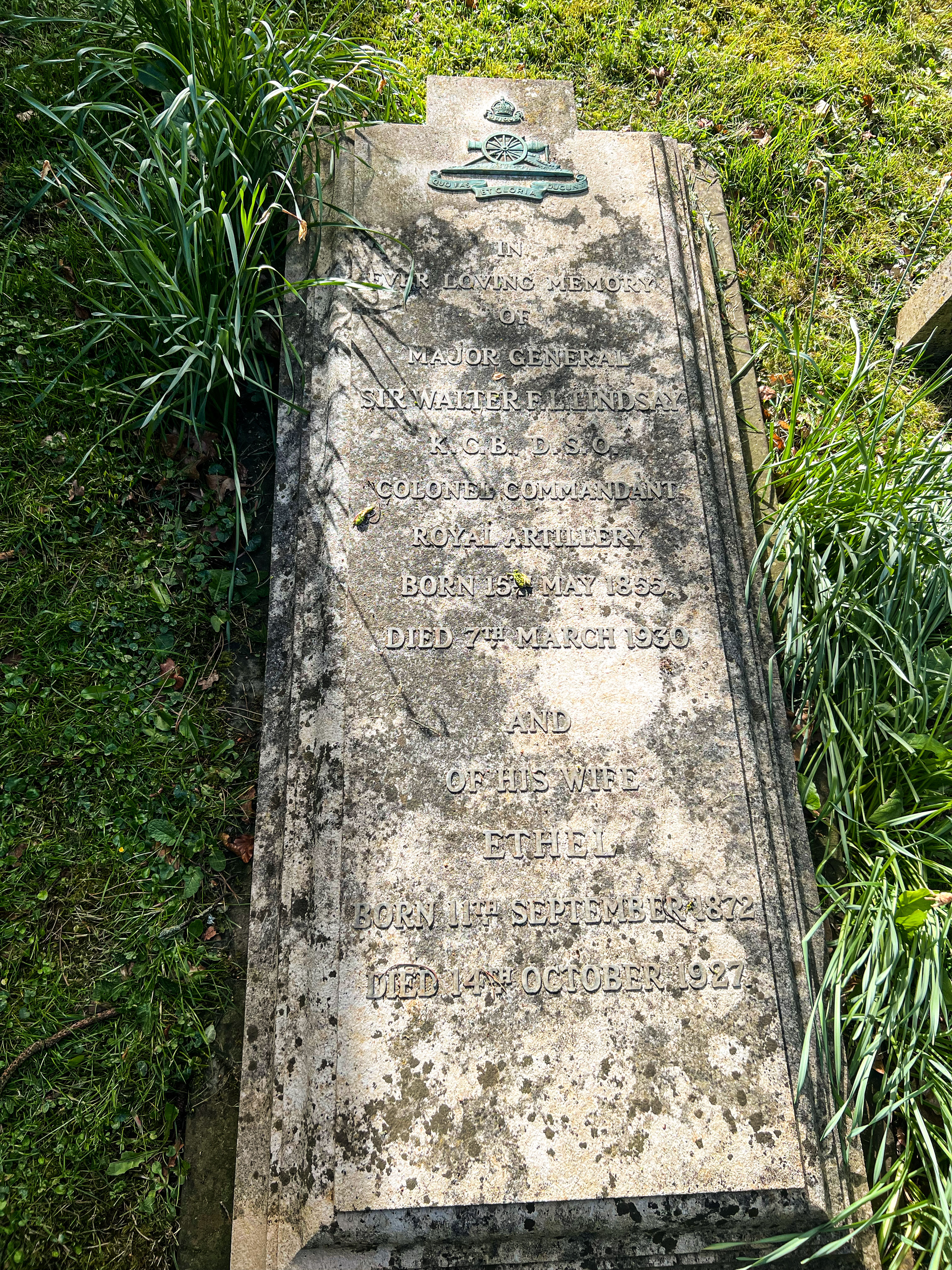
The resting place of Major General Sir Walter Lindsay at St Mary the Virgin Church, Heacham.

Lindsay was born into a Scottish family in Kensington, London, the son of Captain Alexander Lindsay of the 8th Hussars, and his wife, Jane. He was educated in Scotland before continuing to the Royal Military Academy, Woolwich.

He followed his father into the Army, joining the Royal Artillery and seeing overseas service in the Egyptian Campaign of 1882 and the Second Boer War from 1899 to 1900. He was mentioned in despatches and awarded the Distinguished Service Order for his service in South Africa.

After serving on half-pay Lindsay was, in November 1905, promoted to colonel and became a staff officer for Horse and Field Artillery. He later rose to command the Southern Division of the artillery in 1906. In August 1907 he was promoted to temporary brigadier general and became a brigadier general, Royal Artillery. He was made a Companion of the Order of the Bath (CB) in the 1908 Birthday Honours, and in March 1912 was promoted to major general. He was appointed as general officer commanding (GOC) of the West Lancashire Division of the Territorial Force (TF) on 3 June 1912, succeeding Major General Edward Bethune.

On the outbreak of the First World War, he was appointed as the chief artillery officer of the British Expeditionary Force (BEF). He served on the Western Front for the first few months of the war; however, there were few centralised artillery forces commanded by corps or the general headquarters (GHQ) of the BEF at this stage, and as a result Lindsay was sidelined and rarely involved in field operations. He was replaced by John Du Cane in January 1915, returning home with a knighthood and appointed as the inspector of Royal Horse Artillery and Royal Field Artillery. He was later briefly commander of the 50th (Northumbrian) Division, another TF formation which he led at the Second Battle of Ypres in the spring of 1915, before retiring from the army in 1917.

He died in London in March 1930, at the age of 74, after a long illness.

Military offices
Preceded by Edward Bethune	GOC West Lancashire Division; 1912-1914	Succeeded by Frederick Hammersley
Preceded by Benjamin Burton	GOC 50th (Northumbrian) Division; April–June 1915	Succeeded by The Earl of Cavan
