= Frederick Dudgeon =

British army officer (1866–1943)

Major-General Frederick Dudgeon CB
- Born: 1866
- Died: 1943 (aged 76–77)
- Military career
- Allegiance: United Kingdom
- Branch: British Army
- Service years: 1885–1927
- Rank: Major-General
- Commands: 50th (Northumbrian) Division (1923–1927); 8th Infantry Brigade (1919–1921); 56th (1/1st London) Division (1917–1918); 42nd Infantry Brigade (1915–1917); 2nd Battalion, South Lancashire Regiment (1915)
- Conflicts: First World War
- Awards: Companion of the Order of the Bath

Major-General Frederick Annesley Dudgeon, CB (1866–1943) was a British Army officer.

== Military career ==
Dudgeon was commissioned into the South Lancashire Regiment on 29 August 1885.

He attended the Staff College, Camberley, from 1893 to 1894.

He was promoted to lieutenant colonel in February 1912 when he took command of a battalion of his regiment.

Dudgeon served on the Western Front in the First World War, being promoted to temporary colonel in September 1914, as commanding officer of the 2nd Battalion, South Lancashire Regiment, from 1915 and as commander, with the temporary rank of brigadier general, of the 42nd Infantry Brigade from later that year. He was appointed a Companion of the Order of the Bath in the 1915 Birthday Honours, and was promoted to substantive colonel in February 1916. In August 1917 he was promoted to temporary major general and became general officer commanding (GOC) of the 56th (1/1st London) Division.

After the war Dudgeon became commander of the 8th Infantry Brigade in October 1919 and then, after being promoted to major general on 16 August 1921, succeeded Major General Percival Spearman Wilkinson as GOC 50th (Northumbrian) Division from July 1923, before he retired from the army on 4 July 1927.

Military offices
Preceded by William Smith	GOC 56th (1/1st London) Division; 1917–1918	Succeeded by Charles Hull
Preceded by Sir Percival Wilkinson	GOC 50th (Northumbrian) Division; 1923–1927	Succeeded by Sir George Cory
