= John Forster (British Army officer) =

British Army general (1856–1938)

Major-General John Forster CB
- Born: 1856
- Died: 13 June 1938 (aged 81–82)
- Military career
- Allegiance: United Kingdom
- Branch: British Army
- Rank: Major-General
- Commands: Kurram-Kohat Force; Regimental Districts, Southern Ireland; Quetta Brigade; 55th (West Lancashire) Division; 57th (2nd West Lancashire) Division
- Conflicts: Second Anglo-Afghan War; Nile Expedition; First World War
- Awards: Companion of the Order of the Bath

Major-General John Burton Forster CB (1856 – 13 June 1938) was a British Army officer.

== Military career ==
Educated at the Royal Military College, Sandhurst, Forster was commissioned into the Royal Irish Regiment on 23 November 1872.

After seeing action in the Second Anglo-Afghan War in 1879 and then the Nile Expedition in 1884, he became commanding officer of the Kurram-Kohat Force in India in December 1897.

On 19 February 1901 he was promoted to colonel and appointed as an assistant adjutant general in India.

He went on to be Assistant Adjutant-General at the Headquarters of the Bengal Command in 1902, brigadier-general commanding the regimental districts in Southern Ireland in May 1907 and, after being promoted on 31 March 1908 to major general, was commander of the Quetta Brigade in India on 12 April 1910.

Forster returned to the UK to become General Officer Commanding 55th (West Lancashire) Division in September 1914 at the start of the First World War. Due to the casualties suffered by the British Expeditionary Force (BEF) during the opening months of fighting on the Western Front, the division's volunteers were used as reinforcements. After the division's last remaining infantry formation of volunteers departed, he became General Officer Commanding 57th (2nd West Lancashire) Division in April 1915 before retiring in early 1917. He was appointed a Companion of the Order of the Bath on 24 January 1917.

He was honorary colonel of the Royal Irish Regiment from 19 April 1918 to 1922.

He ceased to belong to the Reserve of Officers in April 1922.

Military offices
Preceded by Frederick Hammersley	GOC 55th (West Lancashire) Infantry Division; 1914–1915	Succeeded by Sir Hugh Jeudwine
New title	GOC 57th (2nd West Lancashire) Division; 1915–1916	Succeeded by Robert Broadwood
