= Edward Bethune =

Lieutenant-General Sir Edward Bethune KCB CVO
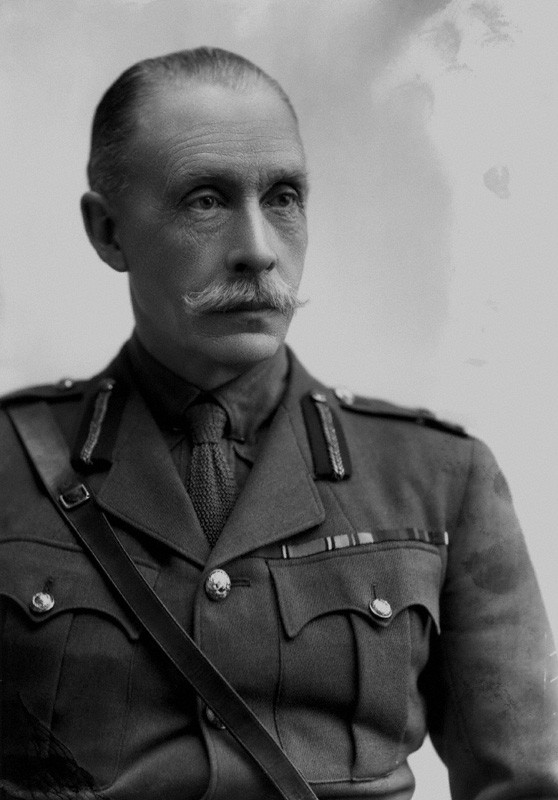
- Bethune in 1917
- Born: 23 June 1855; Kensington, London
- Died: 2 November 1930 (aged 75); Kensington, London
- Spouse: Mary Lilian Elliot Lockhart
- Military career
- Allegiance: United Kingdom
- Branch: British Army
- Service years: 1875–1920
- Rank: Lieutenant-General
- Units: 92nd Foot (The Gordon Highlanders); 6th Dragoon Guards (The Carabiniers)
- Commands: Territorial Force; West Lancashire Division; 16th (The Queen's) Lancers; Bethune's Mounted Infantry
- Conflicts: Second Anglo-Afghan War; First Boer War; Second Boer War; First World War
- Awards: Knight Commander of the Order of the Bath; Commander of the Royal Victorian Order; Mentioned in Despatches (3)
- Other work: Royal British Legion

Lieutenant-General Sir Edward Cecil Bethune, KCB, CVO (23 June 1855 – 2 November 1930) was a British Army officer who raised and led his own regiment, Bethune's Mounted Infantry, in the Second Boer War and directed the Territorials in the First World War.

== Early life ==
Baptised on 4 August 1855 in the church of the Holy Trinity at Paddington, second son of Admiral Charles Ramsay Bethune, 24th of Balfour, and his wife Frances Cecilia Staples, his chosen career was the British Army.

== Military career ==
At the age of 20 he gained a commission in the 92nd (Gordon Highlanders) Regiment of Foot in September 1875, seeing service in the Second Anglo-Afghan War in Afghanistan from 1878 to 1880, where he was present in the operations around Kabul in December 1879. He served with his regiment in the First Boer War in South Africa from 1880 to 1881, and was promoted to captain on 1 February 1884. In 1886, he transferred to a cavalry regiment, the 6th Dragoon Guards (The Carabiniers). Ten years later he again transferred, when he was promoted to major and joined the 16th (The Queen's) Lancers on 4 September 1895. He was appointed a staff officer in the Madras Command as assistant adjutant-general in Burma on 8 January 1898.

Posted again to South Africa in September 1899, on the outbreak of the Second Boer War, he raised and commanded Bethune's Mounted Infantry, receiving the rank of lieutenant colonel on 29 September 1900. His unit fought at the battles of Colenso and Spion Kop, and took part in the relief of Ladysmith. In late 1900 he was recalled to the 16th Lancers as a brevet colonel, becoming their commanding officer and heading a cavalry brigade. Then he was moved to staff work, acting as Assistant Adjutant-General of the Field Force in South Africa. He was mentioned in despatches three times (including in the final despatch by Lord Kitchener dated 23 June 1902).

The war now over, he continued to command his regiment until 29 September 1904 when he relinquished it to Guy Wyndham and was placed on half-pay. He was promoted to colonel on 1 July 1905 and brigadier general in 1905, placed on the General Staff, and appointed in command of the Eastern Sub-District of the Cape Colony. He was appointed a Companion of the Order of the Bath (CB) in the 1905 Birthday Honours.

Raised to major general in 1908, he was appointed Colonel of the 4th (Royal Irish) Dragoon Guards, an honour he held until 1920, and was appointed a Commander of the Royal Victorian Order (CVO) in 1909. He also became General Officer Commanding West Lancashire Division, Territorial Force, Western Command, in January 1909 and then became director general of the TF on 3 June 1912, taking over from Major General John Cowans. Promoted to lieutenant general in November 1913, he was created a Knight Commander of the Order of the Bath (KCB) in 1915, and served throughout the First World War before retiring in 1920 after 45 years. In his retirement he served as Chairman of the Metropolitan Area of the Royal British Legion. He died at his home at 5 Eldon Road, and his will was proved by his widow on 17 December 1930.

== Family ==
On 25 October 1890 at Ootacamund in India he married Mary Lilian Elliot Lockhart (1870–1948), daughter of Brigadier General William Elliot Lockhart and his wife Fanny Ada Clare Carden. A son Edward died in infancy, and their daughter Mary Cecilia (Molly) Bethune married Dr Gerald Evan Spicer, son of Sir Evan Spicer, paper magnate and Chairman of London County Council.

Military offices
Preceded by Edward Dickson	GOC West Lancashire Division; 1909–1912	Succeeded by Walter Lindsay
