= Edwin Plowden, Baron Plowden =

British industrialist and public servant (1907-2001)

The Right Honourable The Lord Plowden GBE KCB

Member of the House of Lords
- Lord Temporal
- Life peerage 17 February 1959 – 15 February 2001

Personal details
- Born: Edwin Noel Auguste Plowden; 6 January 1907 Strachur, Argyll and Bute, Scotland
- Died: 15 February 2001 (aged 94)
- Party: Conservative
- Spouse: Bridget Horatia Richmond (m. 1933; died 2000)
- Parents: Roger Plowden (father); Helen Plowden (mother)
- Education: Le Rosey school, Switzerland
- Alma mater: Hamburg University; Pembroke College, Cambridge

Edwin Noel Auguste Plowden, Baron Plowden, GBE, KCB (6 January 1907 – 15 February 2001) was a British industrialist and public servant in the Treasury.

== Background and career ==
Plowden was born in Strachur, Argyll, the second child of Roger Plowden, a banker and landed proprietor, and his American second wife Helen. The Plowdens were, according to Peter Jay, a long-established Roman Catholic family, originally established in Shropshire about 1200. The young Edwin was educated abroad, at the progressive Le Rosey school in Switzerland and at Hamburg University, before returning to Britain in 1926 to read economics at Pembroke College, Cambridge, where he received an "indifferent degree".

Having the great misfortune to graduate from university at the beginning of the Great Depression, Plowden spent many years unsuccessfully trying to find gainful employment, taking up odd jobs as "a farm labourer, for some months as a ‘general handyman’ in a hospital in Labrador, and as a shop-floor worker and then a travelling salesman for Standard Telephones and Cables." At last, before the Second World War, Plowden secured a better job in the City when he joined C. Tennant Sons & Co, commodity dealers. As he spoke French and German and knew the European mainland well, he was put in charge of selling Palestine potash, in competition with the European potash cartel; he did so to such effect that his firm, as it had hoped, was invited to join the cartel.

During the war, he served in the Ministry of Economic Warfare, and later joined the Ministry of Aircraft Production, in which he remained until 1946. During 1945–46 he was chief executive in succession to Air Chief Marshal Sir Wilfrid Freeman.

He returned after the War to the private sector, but then was appointed Chief Planning Officer to the Cabinet Office in March 1947. The group was called the Central Economic Planning Staff and Plowden headed it for over six years.

In 1954 Plowden became the first chairman of the United Kingdom Atomic Energy Authority (UKAEA).

== Korean War ==
"I was at this stage put in charge of a working party set up to formulate an official reply to the Americans and, over the next year or so, was to be responsible for the general economic supervision of the rearmament programme."

== Conservative Government ==
Rab Butler, Chancellor of the Exchequer (1951–55), inherited Plowden after the Conservatives took power in 1951. He commented, "But I depended on Edwin Plowden, as head of the economic planning staff, to interpret and give practical edge to the advice generated by the less voluble and extrovert Hall (Robert Hall, Baron Roberthall), to act as vulgarisateur or publicist for his ideas. Plowden was to be my faithful watchdog in chief, and his departure for industry in 1953 undoubtedly weakened my position and that of the British economy".

== Personal life ==
His wife, Bridget (née Bridget Horatia Richmond; 1910–2000), chaired the group which authored and published the 1967 Plowden Report on primary education. She was created a Dame Commander of the Order of the British Empire (DBE). The couple had four children: William (1935–2010), Anna (1938–1997), Penelope (b. 1941), and Francis (b. 1945).

== Death ==
Lord Plowden died of hypertension in 2001, aged 94, one year after his wife's death. He predeceased his two sons and one daughter while another daughter predeceased both Sir Edwin and Dame Bridget Plowden.

== Arms ==
Coat of arms of Edwin Plowden, Baron Plowden
Crest A buck passant Sable attired Or. Escutcheon Azure a fess dancettee the upper points terminating in fleurs-de-lys Or.

Plowden was appointed a Knight Commander of the Order of the British Empire (KBE) in the 1946 Birthday Honours, a Knight Commander of the Order of the Bath (KCB) in the 1951 Birthday Honours and was promoted to a Knight Grand Cross of the Order of the British Empire (GBE) in the 1987 Birthday Honours.

He was created a life peer with the title Baron Plowden, of Plowden in the county of Shropshire on 17 February 1959.
