= Barnston, Essex =

Village in Essex, England

Coordinates: 51.8499°N 0.3886°E

Barnston
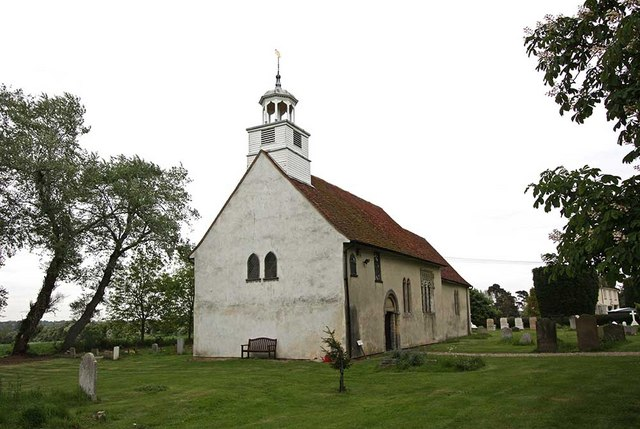
- St Mary, Barnston

- Location within Essex
- Population: 926 (Parish, 2021)
- OS grid reference: TL646195
- Civil parish: Barnston
- District: Uttlesford
- Shire county: Essex
- Region: East
- Country: England
- Sovereign state: United Kingdom
- Post town: DUNMOW
- Postcode district: CM6
- Dialling code: 01371
- Police: Essex
- Fire: Essex
- Ambulance: East of England
- UK Parliament: Saffron Walden
- Website: barnstonvillage.co.uk

Barnston is a village and civil parish in Essex, England. The village is on the B1008 road, about 1 3/4 miles (2.8 km) south-east of Great Dunmow and 9 miles (14 km) north-north-west from the county town of Chelmsford. At the 2021 census the parish had a population of 926.

The local churches are St Andrews and the Mission Evangelical Church.

== Governance ==
The first tier of local government is Barnston parish council. The parish is in the district of Uttlesford and in the parliamentary constituency of Saffron Walden.

== Notable residents ==
Thomas Watson (c. 1620–1686), puritan, retired to the village and died there.

Bridget Plowden (1910–2000), educational reformer, lived in later life at Martels Manor, on the edge of the village.

== See also ==
- The Hundred Parishes
