= Charles Plowden =

English Jesuit priest, teacher, writer and administrator

Charles Plowden (born at Plowden Hall, Shropshire, 1743; died at Jougne, Doubs, France, 13 June 1821) was an English Jesuit priest, teacher, writer and administrator.

== Life ==
He was a descent of Edmund Plowden, and was raised in a Catholic family. He was born to William Ignatius Plowden of Plowden Hall, Shropshire, and his wife, Frances Dormer; his grandfather was Charles, fifth Baron Dormer of Wenge and four of his brothers became Jesuits, including Robert Plowden and the barrister Francis Peter Plowden.

Educated at the College of St Omer, he entered the Society of Jesus in 1759, and was ordained priest at Rome, in 1770.

In 1773, he was minister of the College of Bruges; this was during a time of suppression of the Jesuits. The Austro-Belgic government, in its execution of the decree of suppression, kept him imprisoned for some months after the closing of the college. He wrote an account of its destruction.

After his release from confinement, he was for a time at the College of Liège, which the prince-bishop of Liège had offered to the English ex-Jesuits. Returning to England in 1784 he became a tutor in the family of Thomas Weld, and chaplain at Lulworth Castle. While he was there he assisted at the consecration of Bishop Carroll, in 1790. He preached the sermon on the occasion, and published an account of the establishment of the new See of Baltimore.

Plowden had a large share in the direction of Stonyhurst College, founded in 1794. After the restoration of the Society of England, he was the first master of novices, at Hodder. In 1817, he was appointed Provincial, and at the same time, Rector of Stonyhurst, holding the later office till 1819.

Summoned to Rome for the XXth General Congregation (1820) and election of the Superior General of the Jesuits, he died suddenly in Jougne (France), on his journey homeward, and, through mistaken information to his mission and identity, he was buried with full military honours. His attendant had gathered the information that he had been at Rome in connection with business concerning a "general", and the town authorities, mixing things, concluded that he was a general of the British army, hence the military funeral.

== Works ==
In addition to his many administrative activities and occupations, Plowden was a prolific writer. He was protagonist in the Catholic polemics ahead of the eventual Catholic Relief Bill.

Sommervogel gives a list of twenty-two publications of which he was the author, besides several works in manuscript which have been preserved. He was a lifelong correspondent of Bishop Carroll and wrote a eulogy on the death of his friend in 1815. A large collection of the letters which the interchanged, originals or copies, exists at Stonyhurst and Georgetown College, as also in the Baltimore diocesan archives.

His works include Observations on the Oath (1791) and A Letter to the Catholics of England (1792).
