= George Cory (British Army officer) =

British Army general

Lieutenant-General Sir George Cory KBE CB DSO
- Born: 26 December 1874; Evanston, Illinois, United States
- Died: 17 November 1968 (aged 93); Hempstead, Kent, England
- Military career
- Allegiance: United Kingdom
- Branch: British Army
- Service years: 1895–1931; 1940–1943
- Rank: Lieutenant-General
- Service number: 12271
- Unit: Royal Dublin Fusiliers
- Commands: 50th (Northumbrian) Division (1927–1928); 27th Division
- Conflicts: Second Boer War; First World War; Second World War
- Awards: Knight Commander of the Order of the British Empire; Companion of the Order of the Bath; Distinguished Service Order

Lieutenant-General Sir George Norton Cory, KBE, CB, DSO (26 December 1874 – 17 November 1968) was an American-born Canadian soldier who served with the British Army in India, South Africa and Canada and during the Second Boer War, First World War and Second World War.

== Education ==
Cory was born in Evanston, Illinois, the son of a Canadian father, Charles Dickenson Cory, of Halifax, Nova Scotia, and American mother, Ella Agnes Norton. He was firstly enrolled at Bishop's College School in Quebec, Canada, from 1889 to 1891 and attended their cadet corps. He entered the Royal Military College of Canada in Kingston, Ontario, in 1891. He ranked fourth in the Royal Military College matrix and graduated in 1895.

== Military service ==
Cory was commissioned as a second lieutenant in the Royal Dublin Fusiliers on 28 August 1895, and promoted to lieutenant on 5 January 1897. He saw action in South Africa as adjutant with the Composite Regiment of Mounted Infantry during the Second Boer War, for which he was appointed a companion of the Distinguished Service Order. Promotion to captain followed on 24 February 1900. He attended the Staff College, Camberley, in 1908.

Promoted in February 1913 to major, in October he succeeded Reginald Hildyard as a General Staff Officer Grade 3 at the War Office.

In the First World War Cory served with the British Expeditionary Force on the Western Front from 1914 to 1915. In August 1914 he succeeded Lieutenant Colonel Frederick Maurice as GSO2 of the 3rd (UK) Division. In May 1915 he was made a GSO1 (or chief of staff in most modern armies) of the 51st (Highland) Division. He then fought on the Macedonian front with the British Salonika Army, first as brigadier general, general staff of XVI Corps, commanded by Lieutenant General George Milne, for which he was made a temporary brigadier general while serving in this position. He was appointed a Companion of the Order of the Bath in the 1918 Birthday Honours. In August 1917 he was promoted to temporary major general and succeeded Major General Webb Gillman as major general, general staff of the BSF.

After the war Cory was promoted to substantive major general in January 1919 and became General Officer Commanding 27th Division in May, Deputy Adjutant-General in India in 1921 and then Director of Personal Services in India later in that year. He went on to be Deputy Chief of the General Staff, India in 1922 and was appointed a Knight Commander of the Order of the British Empire in the 1925 Birthday Honours. He relinquished this post in February 1926 and succeeded Major General Frederick Dudgeon as GOC 50th (Northumbrian) Division in July 1927 before giving up this command in April 1928 and being placed on half-pay on 30 April 1928 and finally retiring in 1931.

At the start of the Second World War Cory was recalled to service as Inspector & Chief Liaison Officer to Allied Contingents, working with Dutch, Danes, Poles, French and others across England, a post he took up in 1940. His service in Second World War was warmly recalled after his death in a letter to The Times:

General Cory's fine presence, friendly smile, quick intuition and warm sympathy must have comforted many hearts chilled by exile. His greatest gift was once summed-up as "Knowing what people feel": and there must still be many men in England and in other countries where The Times is read, who remember his war-time visits to them with pleasure and gratitude.

— A.A.R., The Times, 23 November 1968

He retired again in 1943.

Military offices
Preceded by Frederick Dudgeon	GOC 50th (Northumbrian) Division; 1927–1928	Succeeded by Henry Newcome
