= Benjamin Burton (British Army officer) =

British Army officer

Major-General Benjamin Burton CB CMG
- Burton in 1917
- Born: 10 March 1855; Bath, Somerset, England
- Died: 6 August 1921 (aged 66); Falmouth, Cornwall, England
- Military career
- Allegiance: United Kingdom
- Branch: British Army
- Service years: 1875–1915
- Rank: Major-General
- Commands: Northumbrian Division
- Conflicts: Second Boer War; First World War
- Awards: Companion of the Order of the Bath; Companion of the Order of St Michael and St George

Major-General Benjamin Burton, CB, CMG (10 March 1855 – 6 August 1921) was a British Army officer.

== Military career ==
Burton was commissioned into the Royal Artillery on 9 March 1875. He saw action in South Africa during the Second Boer War, for which he was appointed a Companion of the Order of the Bath. He went on to become Commander, Royal Artillery for 1st Division in September 1907 and General Officer Commanding the Northumbrian Division in the United Kingdom in March 1912. He handed over command of his division and retired just before the division was deployed to France in April 1915. He was appointed a Companion of the Order of St Michael and St George in recognition of his services in connection with the First World War on 24 January 1917.

Military offices
Preceded by Frederick Hammersley	GOC Northumbrian Division; 1912–1915	Succeeded by Sir Walter Lindsay
