= Bridget Plowden, Lady Plowden =

British educational reformer (1910–2000)

The Right Honourable The Lady Plowden DBE
- Born: 5 May 1910; Rounton Grange, East Rounton, Yorkshire, England
- Died: 29 September 2000 (aged 90); Barnston, Essex, England
- Occupation: Educational reformer

Bridget Horatia Plowden, Baroness Plowden, DBE (née Richmond; 5 May 1910 – 29 September 2000) was a British educational reformer and influential figure in primary education, broadcasting and the rights of Romani people. She chaired the group which authored and published the 1967 Plowden Report on primary education in Britain, and was chair of the Independent Broadcasting Authority from 1975–80.

== Early life and family ==
Plowden was born Bridget Horatia Richmond at Rounton Grange, East Rounton, Yorkshire, the second daughter and second child of the five children of Admiral Sir Herbert William Richmond (1871–1946), naval officer, and later master of Downing College, Cambridge, and his wife, Florence Elsa (1879/80–1971).

She married the British industrialist and politician Edwin Plowden in 1933. Her husband received several knighthoods and was created a life peer in 1959; consequently, she became Baroness Plowden through her husband. The couple had four children: William (1935–2010), Anna (1938–1997), Penelope (b. 1941), and Francis (b. 1945). In 1947 the couple bought Martels Manor, a medieval farmhouse in Great Dunmow, Essex.

== Career ==
Plowden held roles in numerous charitable organisations, particularly those involving children. In the 1930s she worked as a leader for the Brownies, and as a children's court magistrate. From 1961 to 1972 she was also a director of Trust House Forte.

In August 1963 Plowden was asked by Sir Edward Boyle, the Minister of Education, to chair the Central Advisory Council for Education (England) enquiry into primary schools. The Children and their Primary Schools report was published in 1967 and is popularly known as the Plowden Report. The report promoted a child-centred approach to primary education and became influential in shaping education policy.

Following the publication of the report, Plowden became a co-opted Conservative member of the Inner London Education Authority from 1967 to 1973 and was involved in several later inquiries, committees and organisations relating to education. As late as the 1980s she was fully involved in the annual National Residential Plowden conference. She networked to encourage the BBC and quality newspapers to feature primary education. The Ford Foundation funded the Anglo-American primary schools project, and published over twenty booklets in the United States. From the late 1970s onwards there was intense public debate about the merits of her policies. Her report emphasized the need for education through discovery rather than through instruction, and that creativity and adaptability were essential in a global economy. It insisted that parents had a right to annual reports and recommended objective testing of attainment.

Plowden became a governor and vice-chairman of the BBC in 1970. She left the post in 1975 to take up the chair of the Independent Broadcasting Authority, where she helped to establish a fourth UK television service and breakfast television.

After stepping down as IBA chair in 1980, Plowden went on to serve on the boards of governors for several schools, as well as serving as president of the National Marriage Guidance Council (later Relate) from 1983 to 1993. She was also president of two charities which she established, the Advisory Council for the Education of Romany and other Travellers (in 1973) and the Voluntary Organisations Liaison Council for Under Fives (in 1978).

== Later years and death ==
Plowden remained active into her 80s, but by the 1990s her husband's ill health necessitated a move to live full-time at Martels Manor in Barnston, Essex. She died at home on 29 September 2000.

== Honours ==
In the 1972 Birthday Honours, Plowden was appointed a Dame Commander of the Order of the British Empire (DBE) by Queen Elizabeth II "for services to Education".

Media offices
Preceded by Baron Aylestone	Chairman of the Independent Broadcasting Authority; 1975-1980	Succeeded by Baron Thomson of Monifieth
