= Dorothea Plowden =

British songwriter and librettist

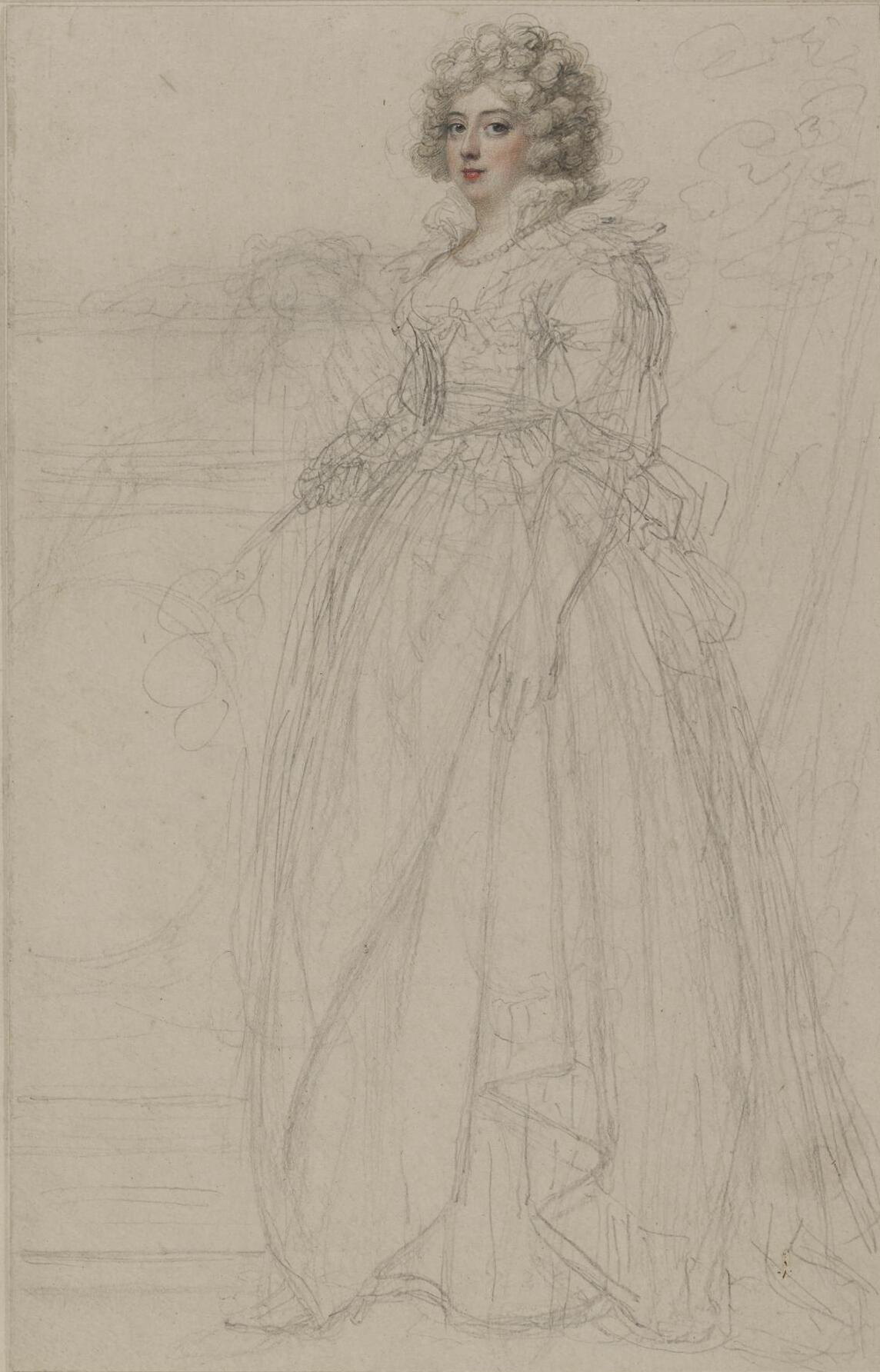
- portrait by Richard Cosway
- Died: 5 June 1827; Hammersmith
- Occupation: Librettist
- Spouse: Francis Plowden
- Children: Capt. Charles Francis Plowden, Anna Maria Plowden
- Father: Griffith Philipps

Dorothea Plowden (died 5 June 1827) was a British songwriter and librettist.

Dorothea Plowden was the daughter of Griffith Phillips, MP for Carmarthen. She married the Catholic writer Francis Plowden in 1779. They had two sons and three daughters, one of whom married Archibald Cochrane, 9th Earl of Dundonald. She was the subject of a portrait by Richard Cosway and a portrait with her sister by Angelica Kauffman.

She wrote the libretto of a 3-act comic opera, Virginia, with music by Samuel Arnold. Virginia was based on Mary Pix's The Innocent Mistress (1697) and Aphra Behn's The Widow Ranter (1690). It premiered at the Drury Lane Theatre on 30 October 1800. The play was poorly received and ran only that night. David Erskine Baker wrote that it was "condemned the first night" while John Genest wrote that it "is a poor Opera [...] in this piece the absurdity is greater than usual." Plowden published her libretto and in its preface blamed the opera's failure on changes made by John Philip Kemble.

Plowden published a number of songs, including "The Coy, Blushing Sylvia".

Dorothea Plowden died on 5 June 1827 in Hammersmith at the home of her son-in-law, the Earl of Dundonald.
