= Robert Plowden =

English Jesuit priest

Robert Plowden (born 27 January 1740; died at Wappenbury, 27 June 1823) was an English Jesuit priest, a firm supporter of Bishop John Milner.

== Life ==
He entered the Society of Jesus in 1756, and was ordained in 1763. After some years spent at Hoogstraten in Belgium, as director of Carmelite nuns, he returned to England, and was stationed at Arlington, Devon, from 1777 to 1787.

Appointed to Bristol, his work resulted in the erection of St. Joseph's Church, together with a parochial residence and schools. His activity extended to the mission of Swansea and South Wales District, of which he may be considered a principal founder.

Removed from Bristol in 1815, he became chaplain to the Fitzherbert family at Swynnerton until 1820, when he retired to Wappenbury, where he died. He was a keen theologian, "a more solid divine than his brother Charles", according to Bishop Carroll.

== Works ==
He translated into English: "The Elevation of the Soul to God", a spiritual treatise of Barthélemy Baudrand, a French Jesuit. This passed through several editions in England (American editions: Philadelphia, 1817, and New York, 1852).

== Family ==
He was the elder brother of Charles Plowden and Francis Peter Plowden.
