= Anna Plowden =

Archaeological conservator and restorer (1938–1997)

The Honourable Anna Plowden CBE
- Born: Anna Plowden; 18 June 1938
- Died: 21 August 1997 (aged 59)
- Education: Institute of Archaeology, London; British School of Archaeology
- Parent(s): Edwin Plowden, Baron Plowden; Bridget Plowden, Baroness Plowden
- Scientific career
- Fields: Archaeology, conservation and restoration of cultural property
- Institutions: Plowden & Smith Ltd; Victoria & Albert Museum

Anna Bridget Plowden (18 June 1938 – 21 August 1997) was a British archaeological conservator and restorer. She has been described as the first scientifically trained conservator to work in the private sector, rather than in a museum or university.

== Earky life and education ==
She was the daughter of British industrialist and politician Edwin Plowden and educational reformer Bridget Plowden (Lord and Lady Plowden). After attending New Hall School in Boreham near Chelmsford, Essex, England, she enrolled at the Institute of Archaeology in 1962. At the time, the Institute was a college within the University of London, though it is now part of University College London. She earned a Diploma in Conservation in 1963, which led to a Fellowship from the British School of Archaeology in Iraq. This opportunity enabled her to contribute to the conservation and restoration of the Nimrud Ivories at the National Museum of Iraq.

== Career ==
She worked as a freelance conservator, having set up her own business, Anna Plowden Ltd, in 1968. In order to take on larger projects, her business merged with Peter Smith (R and R) Ltd in 1985; Plowden and Smith Ltd remains "one of the largest and most successful businesses in the conservation private sector".

The Royal Warrant Holders Association established the Plowden Medal Conservation Award in 1999 in commemoration of Plowden. The award has become the most significant in the UK Conservation sector.

== Honours ==
In 1970, Plowden was elected a Fellow of the International Institute for Conservation. In the 1997 New Year Honours, she was appointed a Commander of the Order of the British Empire (CBE) by Queen Elizabeth II "for conservation services to museums".

In 1998, the "Anna Plowden Trust" was founded in memory of Anna Plowden to support education and training in historic preservation.
