= Francis Plowden (barrister) =

English barrister

Francis Peter Plowden (8 June 1749 – 4 January 1829) was an English Jesuit, barrister and writer.

== Life ==
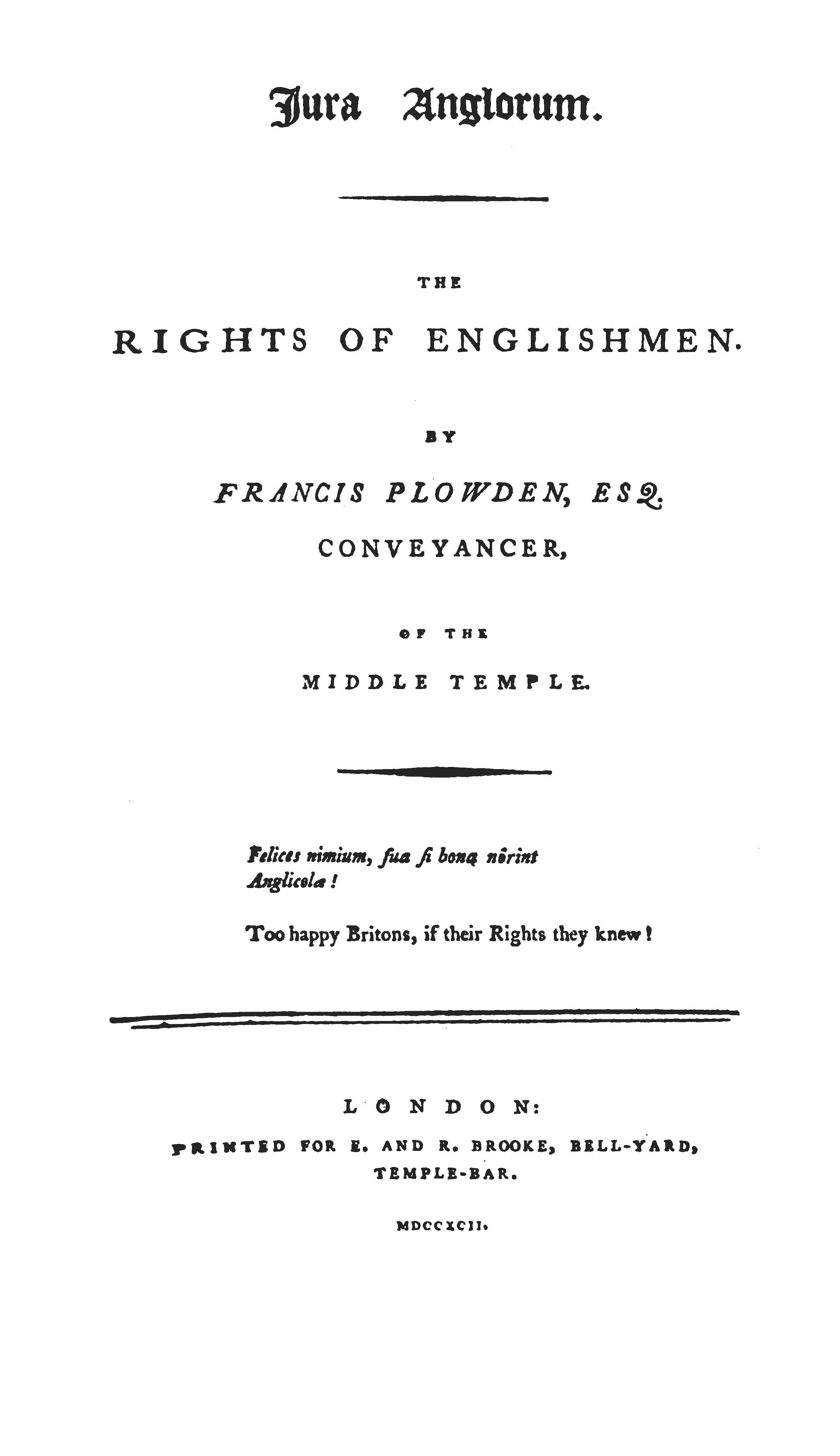
The title page of Plowden's Jura Anglorum (1792)

Francis Plowden, born in Shropshire on 8 June 1749, was the eighth son of William Ignatius Plowden of Plowden Hall; his grandfather was Charles, fifth Baron Dormer of Wenge and five of his brothers became Jesuits including Charles Plowden and Robert Plowden.

He was educated at St. Omer's College and entered the Jesuit novitiate at Watten in 1766.

When the Society was suppressed, he was teaching at the College at Bruges. Not being in holy orders he was, by the terms of suppression, relieved of his first vows, and soon afterwards married Dorothea Plowden, daughter of Griffith Philipps esq. (1712-1781) MP for Carmarthen (1751), of Cwmgwili, Carmarthenshire and of Lucretia Elizabeth Folkes, daughter of Henry, and niece of Martin Folkes.

He entered the Middle Temple and practiced as a conveyancer, the only department of the legal profession open to Catholics under the Penal Laws. After the Roman Catholic Relief Act 1791 (31 Geo. 3. c. 32) he was called to the Bar. His first major work, Jura Anglorum, appeared in 1792, a conservative formulation of natural rights and contract theory. It was attacked in a pamphlet by his brother Robert Plowden, a priest under the title of "A Roman Catholic Clergyman". The book was so highly thought of that the University of Oxford presented him with the honorary degree of D.C.L., a unique distinction for a Catholic of those days.

His improvidence, extreme views, and intractable disposition made his life a troubled one. Having fallen out with the Lord Chancellor, he ceased to practice at the bar and devoted himself to writing. While in Dublin (1811) he published his work "Ireland since the Union" which led to a prosecution on the part of the Government for libel, resulting in a verdict of £5000 damages. Plowden considered that this was rewarded by a packed jury and determined not to pay it. He escaped to Paris where he spent the remaining years of his life in comparative poverty as a professor at the Scots College, dying on 4 January 1829, aged 79.

== Family ==
The comic play, Virginia, by his wife Dorothea Plowden was condemned following its premier performance.

Their eldest daughter, Anna Maria, became the third countess of Archibald, ninth earl of Dundonald.

== Works ==
Plowden published the first of three volumes of the Historical Review of the State of Ireland in 1803. This was written at the request of the Government, but it was too outspoken a condemnation to meet their views, and was attacked by Richard Musgrave in the Historical Review and also by the British Critic. Plowden answered by a Posthumous Preface giving an account of his communications with Henry Addington, 1st Viscount Sidmouth, and also by a Historical Letter to Sir Richard Musgrave.

His Historical Letters to Sir John Coxe Hippisley (1815) contained matter connected with the question of Catholic emancipation. His other works are:

- The Case Stated (Cath. Relief Act, 1791).
- Church and State (London, 1794).
- Treatise on the Law of Usury (London, 1796).
- The Constitution of the United Kingdom (London, 1802).
- Historical Review of the State of Ireland from the Invasion Henry II to the Union (3 volumes 1803-1805)
- History of Ireland from the Union to October 1810 (3 volumes)
- Historical Letters to Rev. C. O'Connor (Dublin, 1812).
- Human Subordination (Paris, 1824).
