= William Julius Lowthian Plowden =

The Honourable William Julius Lowthian Plowden (7 February 1935 – 26 June 2010) was a British political science academic and government advisor.

== Biography ==
Plowden's parents, Lord and Lady Plowden, were both public servants and he was educated at Eton and King's College, Cambridge, where he took his doctorate. He was awarded a Harkness Fellowship at the University of California, Berkeley. On his return he was briefly in 1958 a staff writer for The Economist, then joined in 1959 with a stellar pass of the annual Civil service examination the Board of Trade. In 1965 he left the civil service when he was appointed as lecturer on government at the London School of Economics (LSE).

Plowden joined Edward Heath's Downing Street think-tank the Central Policy Review Staff (CPRS) as a founder-member, before a short period in 1977 as an Under Secretary in the Department of Industry.

Plowden then joined the Royal Institute of Public Administration as Director-General, where he stayed for ten years.

Plowden rejoined the LSE in 1982. He later wrote a candid book with Tessa Blackstone about advising government. He later went to New York as executive director of the Harkness Fellowships from 1988 to 1991, and was subsequently Senior Adviser to the Harkness Fellowships in London from 1991 to 1998.

Plowden held a number of research professorships, notably at University of Warwick. He was a member from 1987 to 2006 of the Court of Governors at the LSE and in 2000 was elected to its Council. He continued to act as an independent consultant from 1991.

== Legacy and selected publications ==
The Motor Car and Politics, published around 1970, posed the question: "Can we afford the car?" It forecast out-of-town shopping centres that would destroy Britain's high streets.

A Joint Framework for Social Policies, published in 1975, was described by the Daily Telegraph in his obituary as a "landmark".

Inside the Think Tank was co-written with Blackstone in 1988 and attacked the cut by Margaret Thatcher of the CPRS as "manifestly absurd". In a spat with Oxford University Press over changes demanded by the Cabinet Secretary, they eventually published at Heinemann.

Ministers and Mandarins was published by him alone in 1994.

The William Plowden Fellowship Lecture is held annually at the LSE's Department of Social Policy.

=== Plowden Lectures ===
- 2017: "Localism and devolution - Exploring the role and prospects for cooperative governance of prisons and prison services"

== Family ==
In 1960 Plowden wed Veronica Gascoigne, with whom he had two sons and two daughters.
