= Francis Plowden (British Army officer) =

British army officer

Major-General Francis Plowden CB
- Born: 15 August 1851
- Died: 24 August 1911 (aged 60)
- Military career
- Allegiance: United Kingdom
- Branch: British Army
- Rank: Major-General
- Commands: Northumbrian Division
- Awards: Companion of the Order of the Bath

Major-General Francis Hugh Plowden CB (15 August 1851 – 24 August 1911) was a British Army officer.

== Military career ==
Plowden was commissioned into the 43rd (Monmouthshire) Regiment of Foot on 5 October 1872.

He served as commanding officer (CO) of the 2nd Battalion, Oxfordshire Light Infantry, as the regiment was then titled, in skirmishes with Pathans on the North West Frontier of India in 1897 for which he was mentioned in dispatches.

During the Second Boer War (1899–1902) he held several temporary appointments in India while the actual holder was with the forces in South Africa. He was an assistant adjutant general at the headquarters of the Bengal Command from April 1900 (during the temporary posting to headquarters Simla of Lieutenant Colonel Greenfield), and held the command of the second class district of Belgaum, Madras Command, from August 1900 (in the absence of Colonel Sir Reginald Hart and then of Hector MacDonald).

He was appointed a Companion of the Order of the Bath (CB) in the 1904 Birthday Honours.

He then became general officer commanding (GOC) of the Northumbrian Division of the Territorial Force (TF) in March 1910 before his death in August 1911, shortly after turning 60.

Military offices
Preceded by Robert Baden-Powell	Northumbrian Division; 1910–1911	Succeeded by Frederick Hammersley
