= Francis Plowden (businessman) =

British board member

Francis John Plowden (born 25 June 1945) is a former member of the Judicial Appointments Commission.

Plowden was born in 1945, the younger son of Edwin Plowden, Baron Plowden and his wife Bridget. He was educated at Eton College and Trinity College, Cambridge, where he graduated with a degree in economics in 1966. Plowden is Chairman of the Greenwich Foundation for the Old Royal Naval College. He was a partner at PricewaterhouseCoopers until 2001, where he was responsible for public policy and management work worldwide. He has previously held board positions in the public, private, and voluntary sectors. He was Chairman of the National Council for Palliative Care until 2008. He was a lay member of the Judicial Appointments Commission from 2006 to 2012.
