= Plowden Report =

1967 report into primary education in England

Front cover of Volume I (The Main Report) of the Plowden Report (1967)

The Plowden Report is the unofficial name for the 1967 report of the Central Advisory Council For Education (England) into primary education in England. The report, entitled Children and their Primary Schools, reviewed primary education in a wholesale fashion. The collation of the report took around 3 years. The Council was chaired by Bridget, Lady Plowden after whom the report is named.

== Context ==
The report was commissioned by Education minister, Sir Edward Boyle in 1963. He requested that the council "consider primary education in all its aspects and the transition to secondary education."

At that time, the last such investigation into the nature of primary education had been undertaken by the Hadow Committee led by Sir William Henry Hadow in the early 1930s. During the time of collating the report, the Labour Government of the day introduced circular 10/65 requesting that local education authorities submit plans to replace the tripartite system and 11-plus with comprehensive schooling. The administration also made clear its intention to raise school-leaving age to 16 (from the then 15).

In the years leading up to, and during the collation of the report, prevalent thinking in educational psychology was highly influenced by the work of such people as Jean Piaget who published a seminal work on the matter in 1962.

== Main findings ==
The report was widely known for its praising of child-centred approaches to education, stressing that "at the heart of the educational process lies the child".

Recommendations in the report included those listed below:

- All schools should have a programme for contact with children's homes (Ch. 4)
- Primary schools should be used as fully as possible out of ordinary hours (Ch. 5)
- A national policy of "positive discrimination" should favour schools in deprived neighbourhoods (Ch. 5)
- Training college should expand opportunities for teachers to train in teaching English to immigrants (Ch. 6)
- Surveys of primary education should be undertaken every 10 years (Ch. 8)
- Nursery education should be available to children at any time after they reach the age of three (Ch. 9)
- A three-tier system of first, middle and secondary schools, with transfer at ages 8 and 12. (Ch. 10)
- Authorities maintaining selection should not rely on intelligence and attainment tests. (Ch. 11)
- The infliction of physical pain as a method of punishment in primary schools should be forbidden. (Ch. 19)
- The maximum size of primary school classes should be reduced (Ch. 20)
- The term "slow learner" should be substituted for "educationally sub-normal". (Ch. 21)
- More men teachers are needed in primary schools (Ch. 25)

== Implementation ==
By the time the report was returned to the Ministry of Education, the change of government had led to the appointment of Anthony Crosland as minister. He received the report in 1967, but implementation of the recommendations was piecemeal.

In some areas, local education authorities implemented changes themselves, such as the introduction of three-tier education systems in many places. Similarly, over the 40 years, many of the recommendations which first appeared in the report, have evolved and appeared in legislation under other guises, such as the widespread introduction of state-funded nursery provision, Extended Schools, requirement for a Home School Agreement to be presented (but not signed), the ban on corporal punishment, ESOL programmes, Educational Action Zones and most of all the comprehensive system. However the three-tier system is now uncommon in Britain with a two-tier system of primary school followed by a transition aged 11 to secondary school being normal. The system of children transferring to secondary school at the age of 12 has now been almost completely abandoned.

Male teachers remain a small minority in primaries.

== New Primary Review ==
A new review of primary education in England began on 2 October 2006 under the leadership of Professor Robin Alexander under the title The Primary Review.

== Primary sources ==
The official records of the Plowden committee are held in the records created or inherited by the Department of Education and Science, and of related bodies The National Archives. The personal papers of Bridget Horatia Plowden, including records regarding the Plowden Report are held in the Archives of the Institute of Education, University of London, (Ref: DC/PL) .
