= South Irish Horse =

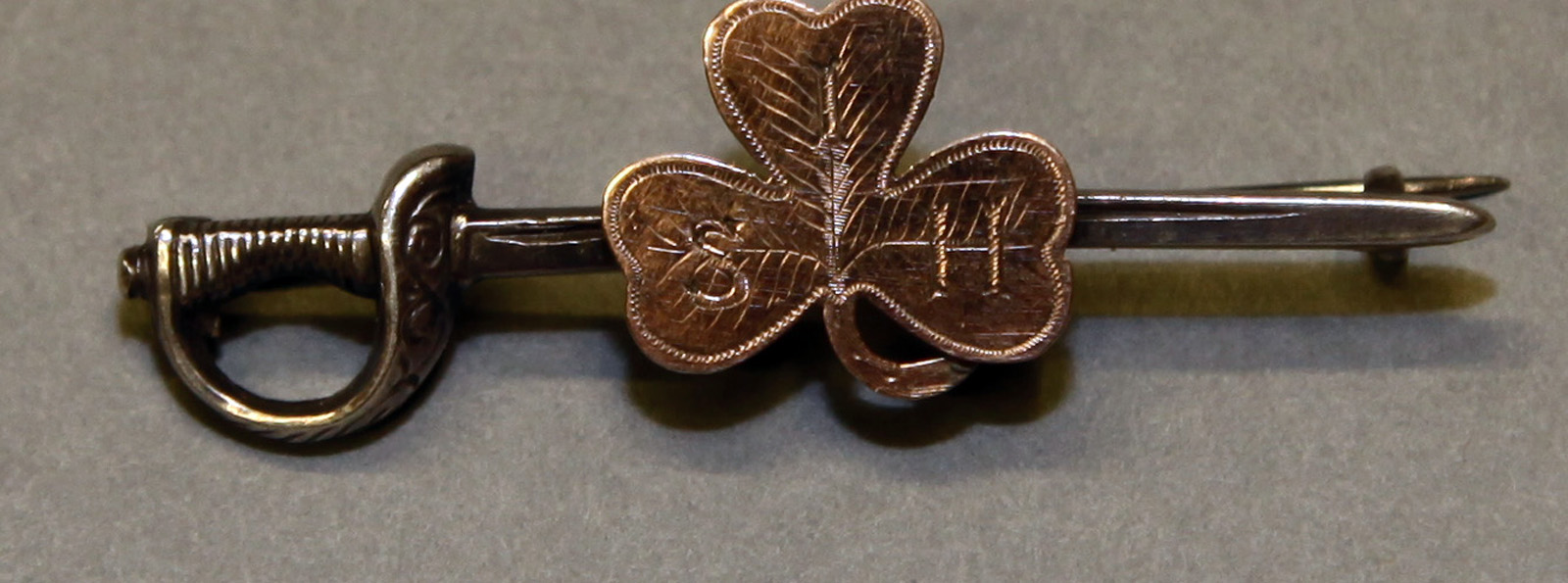
- A "Sweetheart pin" with the emblem of the South Irish Horse (SIH), sent by a soldier to his girlfriend as a memento
- Active: 7 January 1902–31 July 1922
- Country: United Kingdom of Great Britain and Ireland
- Branch: British Army
- Type: Yeomanry
- Size: 4–6 Squadrons
- RHQ: Limerick; Dublin

Commanders
- Colonel-in-Chief: Field Marshal Arthur, Duke of Connaught and Strathearn

The South Irish Horse was a Special Reserve cavalry regiment of the British Army. Formed as an Imperial Yeomanry regiment in 1902 as the South of Ireland Imperial Yeomanry, it perpetuated a unit formed during the Second Boer War. It transferred to the Special Reserve (Cavalry) in 1908 and was renamed as the South Irish Horse. Having taken part in the fighting of World War I, it was disbanded after Irish Independence in 1922.

== Imperial Yeomanry ==
Following a string of defeats during Black Week in early December 1899, the British government realised that it would need more troops than just the Regular Army to fight the Second Boer War, particularly mounted units. On 13 December, the War Office decided to allow volunteer forces to serve in the field, and a Royal Warrant was issued on 24 December that officially created the Imperial Yeomanry (IY). This was organised as service companies of approximately 115 men enlisted for one year. They were equipped to operate as Mounted infantry, armed with a Lee–Metford infantry rifle and bayonet instead of a cavalry carbine and sabre.

Among the units raised was the 61st (South Irish Horse (Dublin)) Company (also known as the 2nd Dublin) formed on 7 March 1900 at Dublin, which served in the 17th Battalion, IY, alongside the 60th (North Irish Horse (Belfast)) Company and two English companies. (At the same time the 74th (Dublin) Company was raised in 16th Battalion and the 99th (Irish) Company in 8th Battalion. In 1901 the 29th Battalion (Irish Horse) was formed, with 131st–134th and 175th–176th (Irish Horse) Companies).

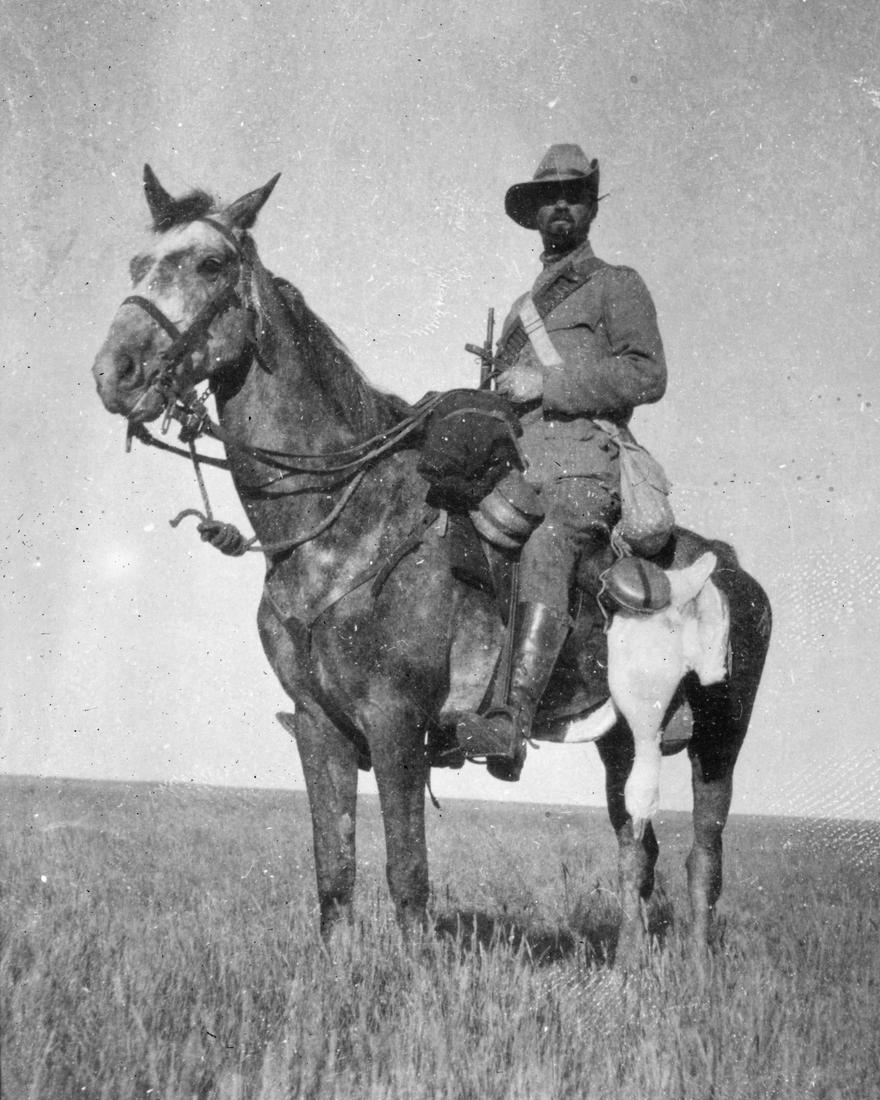
A typical Imperial Yeoman on campaign

The 17th Battalion together with the 18th (Sharpshooters) Battalion embarked on the SS Galecka in April and landed at Beira in Portuguese East Africa on 4 May 1900 to join the Rhodesian Field Force (RFF) under Lt-Gen Sir Frederick Carrington. After a slow railway journey, the yeomanry companies assembled at Umtali in late June, by which time sickness was rife and there had been a number of deaths. While the leading brigades of the RFF pushed south into Transvaal, the two Yeomanry battalions did not reach Bulawayo until the beginning of September. They had nothing to do, apart from a small expedition against a native chief, which did not involve the 61st Company. In preparation for a move into Transvaal, the Yeomanry moved to Tuli, where they were still stationed, practising musketry, at the end of October.

Finally the Yeomanry moved on to Kimberley and the RFF was dispersed by the end of December. On 16 December Boer forces crossed the Orange River into Cape Colony in an effort to raise rebellion. In response the 17th and 18th Bns were sent down under Colonel Parke of the Sharpshooters and formed one of the columns hunting down the invaders. The war now developed into a drawn-out phase of Guerrilla warfare, with the British mounted troops engaged in 'drives' across the veldt, forcing the Boers against lines of blockhouses. Many of the IY went home at the end of their year's engagement, to be replaced by fresh recruits from the Second Contingent. As late as February 1902, 17th Battalion formed part of a column in a coordinated series of drives across North East Orange Free State.

The Imperial Yeomanry concept was considered a success, and in 1901 the 38 part-time Yeomanry Cavalry regiments at home were converted to the same mounted infantry role and designated Imperial Yeomanry. In addition, 18 new regiments (two in Ireland) were raised with returning IY veterans providing the nuclei. 61st (South Irish Horse) Company was perpetuated in the South of Ireland Imperial Yeomanry, approved by King Edward VII in 1901, and gazetted on 7 January 1902. The regiment was initially based at Limerick.

The Marquess of Waterford, a former lieutenant in the Royal Horse Guards, was appointed as commanding officer on 10 February 1902 with the rank of lieutenant-colonel. The following month he was seconded with the temporary rank of captain in the Army. to the 37th (Highland Horse) Battalion, a new unit being sent out to South Africa as part of the Third Contingent of the IY. The battalion left in late May 1902, arriving in Cape Town the following month. However, the Treaty of Vereeniging had been signed while they were at sea, and Lord Waterford soon came home, resigning his captain's commission on 25 August 1902, and returning to command the new South Irish regiment.

== Special Reserve ==
When the Haldane Reforms were introduced under the Territorial and Reserve Forces Act 1907, most of the Imperial Yeomanry were transferred to the new Territorial Force (TF), but this did not extend to Ireland. Instead, the South Irish Horse, together with the North Irish Horse and King Edward's Horse (The King's Overseas Dominions Regiment), became part of the Special Reserve (SR), formed from the old Militia. Unlike the TF, which was intended for home defence in the first instance, the SR was constituted as a reserve for the Regular Army. The transfer of the South Irish Horse to the SR was approved on 20 October 1908. Squadrons were formed as follows:

- HQ – Artillery Barracks, Limerick, to Dublin by 1914
- A Squadron – Beggars Bush Barracks, Dublin
- B Squadron – Artillery Barracks, Limerick
- C Squadron – Glen House, Ballyvolane, Cork
- D Squadron – Beggars Bush Barracks, Dublin

The Marquess of Waterford died on 1 December 1911. From 20 January 1912 the CO of the South Irish Horse was Lord Decies, a former officer in the 7th Hussars (who had been Lord Waterford's CO in the 37th Bn IY).

Prior to World War I the South Irish Horse was attached to the Regular 3rd Cavalry Brigade at The Curragh.

== World War I ==
The declaration of war against Germany in August 1914 found the South Irish Horse at summer camp, as was its sister regiment the North Irish Horse. The Expeditionary Force squadron of North Irish Horse (designated A Squadron), along with its counterpart in the South Irish Horse (designated B Squadron) was assigned to the British Expeditionary Force as 'Army Troops/. Both squadrons sailed from Dublin on the SS Architect on 17 August 1914.

At a critical point during the First Battle of Ypres, two Troops of B Sqn were among the corps troops scraped together by Sir Douglas Haig (I Corps) on 22 October to fill a gap in the line at Hollebeke.

=== Divisional and Corps cavalry ===
The other squadrons, including three additional squadrons that were raised as the war continued, were assigned to New Army Divisions as divisional cavalry squadrons. A Reserve Regiment was formed at Cahir in 1914 to supply reinforcements to the service squadrons.

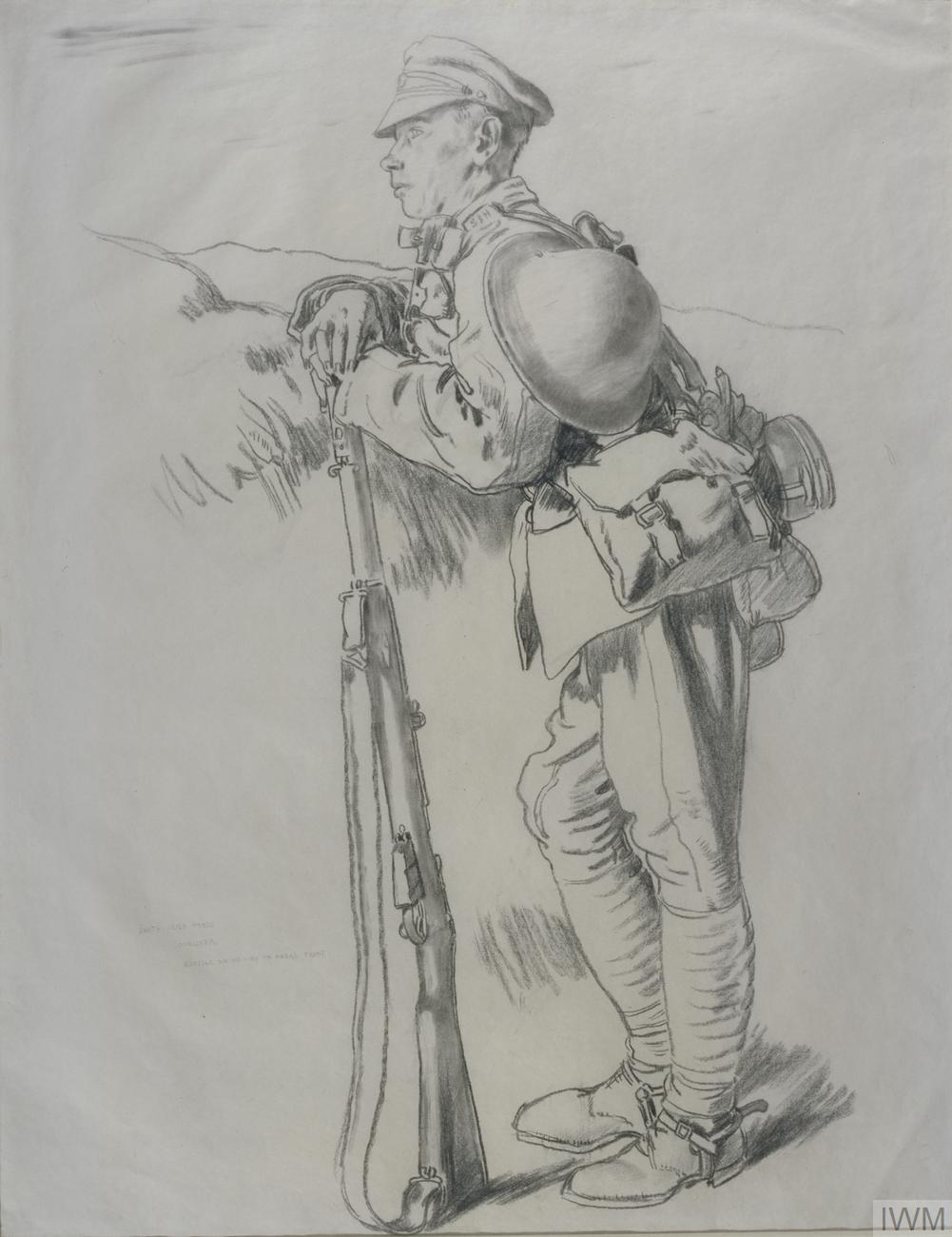
South Irish Horse, a Dubliner resting on his way to Arras Front, drawing by William Orpen, 1917

- A Squadron – joined 21st Division at Aldershot in 1915, landed at Le Havre 12 September 1915; went to form part of XV Corps Cavalry Regiment 11 May 1916, to IX Corps Cavalry Regiment November 1916, and to XVIII Corps Cavalry Regiment on 16 January 1917.
- B Squadron – moved to France as GHQ Troops in August 1914, joined 2nd Division on 4 May 1915; went to form part of I Corps Cavalry Regiment 15 May 1916 and redesignated S Squadron.
- C Squadron – joined 16th (Irish) Division at Aldershot in 1915 and went to France 16 December 1915; to I Corps Cavalry Regiment on 17 May 1916.
- E Squadron – landed at Le Havre and joined 39th Division on 17 March 1916; to I Corps Cavalry Regiment 17 May 1916.
- S Squadron – joined 32nd Division on Salisbury Plain in 1915 and landed at Le Havre 25 November 1915; went to form part of XV Corps Cavalry Regiment 14 May 1916 and redesignated B Squadron; to IX Corps Cavalry Regiment 21 November 1916, and to XVIII Corps Cavalry Regiment January 1917.

From 17 May 1916, C, E and S Sqns, constituting I Corps Cavalry Regiment, were known as the 1st South Irish Horse. On 18 May F Sqn arrived from Ireland, replacing B Sqn 1/1st Hertfordshire Yeomanry in XVIII Corps Cavalry Regiment, which thereafter consisted of A, B and F Sqns, known as the 2nd South Irish Horse.

=== 7th (South Irish Horse) Battalion, Royal Irish Regiment ===
The Trench warfare of the Western Front meant that there was little need for mounted troops. 1st and 2nd South Irish Horse were amalgamated in August 1917, dismounted, and sent for retraining as infantry. They were reorganised as 7th (South Irish Horse) Battalion, Royal Irish Regiment, between 1 September and 10 November 1917 at the infantry base depot at Étaples and joined 49th Brigade of 16th (Irish) Division.

When the German Spring Offensive was launched on 21 March 1918, 16th (Irish) Division was holding a slight salient, with its Forward Zone stretched across a series of spurs. The Germans coming out of the morning mist were through the forward zone that some battalions were overrun before they realised that the attack had begun. The Official History records that, 'two companies of 7th Battalion Royal Irish Regiment, posted in forward zones, suffered terribly; not a man succeeded in escaping.' (Note: Murland misidentifies the 7th (SIH) Royal Irish Regiment as the 7th Royal Irish Rifles, which had left 16th (Irish) Division the previous November.) The survivors of 16th (Irish) Division, fighting as a group of composite battalions, retreated to the River Somme before the 'Great Retreat' ended on 29 March and the division was relieved on 3 April.

After its casualties, the battalion was reduced to a training cadre on 18 April, and on 17 June it transferred to 102nd Bde of 34th Division. 7th (SIH) Battalion was reconstituted on 26 June 1918 with 500 men drawn from the Royal Dublin Fusiliers, 250 from the Royal Munster Fusiliers and 85 from the Royal Irish Regiment. (Note: One source indicates that the South Irish Horse was also reconstituted at this time, but this may relate to the Reserve Regiment, which continued to serve in Ireland until it was disbanded in 1919.)

The reconstituted 7th (SIH) Bn joined 21st Bde in 30th Division on 4 July, serving with it until the end of the war, including the Capture of Wulverghem on 2 September, the Fifth Battle of Ypres, and the Battle of Courtrai.

== Disbandment ==
The regiment was one of the six southern Irish regiments of the British Army disbanded on 31 July 1922 following the creation of the new Irish Free State.

== Heritage & ceremonial ==
Memorial to the fallen of the South Irish Horse in World War I at St Patrick's Cathedral, Dublin

=== Uniform & insignia ===
Khaki service dress with (until 1906) a slouch hat was worn by all Imperial Yeomanry regiments. The parade dress of the South Irish Horse worn until 1914 was green 'Frock' (tunic) with patch pockets, and a red and green collar and girdle. Overalls (tight fitting cavalry breeches) were green with double scarlet stripes. The dark green peaked cap had a red band and in service dress was won with a khaki cover; a full-dress head-dress was considered but never adopted. The gilt shamrock badge was used on the cap and collar.

=== Honorary Colonel ===
The Honorary Colonel of the regiment, appointed on 19 March 1904, was Field Marshal Prince Arthur, Duke of Connaught and Strathearn.

=== Battle honours ===
The regiment was awarded the following Battle honours:

- Loos
- Somme, 1916
- 1918
- Albert, 1918
- St Quentin
- Rosières
- Avre
- Ypres, 1918
- Courtrai
- France and Flanders, 1915–1918.

=== Great War Memorials ===
- Irish National War Memorial Gardens, Dublin.
- Island of Ireland Peace Park Messines, Belgium.
- Menin Gate Memorial Ypres, Belgium.
- Ulster Tower Memorial Thiepval, France.
