= Battle of Langemarck =

Battle of Langemarck may refer to:

- Battle of Langemarck (1914), part of the First Battle of Ypres
- Battle of Langemarck (1917), part of the Third Battle of Ypres
