= 48th Brigade (United Kingdom) =

Military unit

The 48th Brigade was a brigade of the British Army.

== World War I ==
During World War I, the 48th Brigade was part of the New Army also known as Kitchener's Army. It was assigned to the 16th (Irish) Division and served on the Western Front. Units during World War I included:

- 7th Battalion, Royal Irish Rifles
- 9th Battalion, Royal Munster Fusiliers
- 8th Battalion, Royal Dublin Fusiliers
- 9th Battalion, Royal Dublin Fusiliers
- 1st Battalion, Royal Munster Fusiliers
- 2nd Battalion, Royal Dublin Fusiliers
- 1st Battalion, Royal Dublin Fusiliers
- 2nd Battalion, Royal Munster Fusiliers
- 22nd Battalion, Northumberland Fusiliers
- 18th Battalion, Cameronians (Scottish Rifles)
- 11th Battalion, Royal Irish Fusiliers
- 5th Battalion, Royal Irish Fusiliers
- 10th Battalion, Royal Dublin Fusiliers
- 48th Machine Gun Company
- 48th Trench Mortar Battery

The infantry battalions did not all serve at once, but all were assigned to the brigade during the war.

== Post-war ==
48th Gurkha Infantry Brigade was formed in December 1949 by the redesignation of Johore Sub-District in Penang, Malaya. It was assigned in September 1952 to the new 17th Gurkha Division. By April 1957 it was part of the garrison in Hong Kong (British Forces Overseas Hong Kong). It was redesignated in December 1976 as the Gurkha Field Force. It was again redesignated in 1987 as the 48th Gurkha Infantry Brigade. It was disbanded in the early 1990s.
