= 16th (Irish) Division =

WWI British infantry division

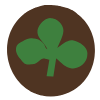
- Active: 1914 – 1919
- Country: United Kingdom of Great Britain and Ireland
- Branch: British Army
- Type: Infantry
- Size: Division
- Engagements: World War I; Battle of Hulluch; Battle of the Somme; Battle of Guillemont; Battle of Ginchy; Battle of Messines; Battle of Passchendaele; German spring offensive

Commanders
- Notable commanders: Major-General William Hickie

The 16th (Irish) Division was an infantry division of the British Army, raised for service during World War I. The division was a voluntary 'Service' formation of Lord Kitchener's New Armies, created in Ireland from the 'National Volunteers', initially in September 1914, after the outbreak of the Great War. In December 1915, the division moved to France, joining the British Expeditionary Force (BEF), under the command of Irish Major General William Hickie, and spent the duration of the war in action on the Western Front. Following enormous losses at the Somme, Passchendaele and Ypres, the 16th (Irish) Division required a substantial refit in England between June and August 1918, which involved the introduction of many non-Irish battalions.

== History ==
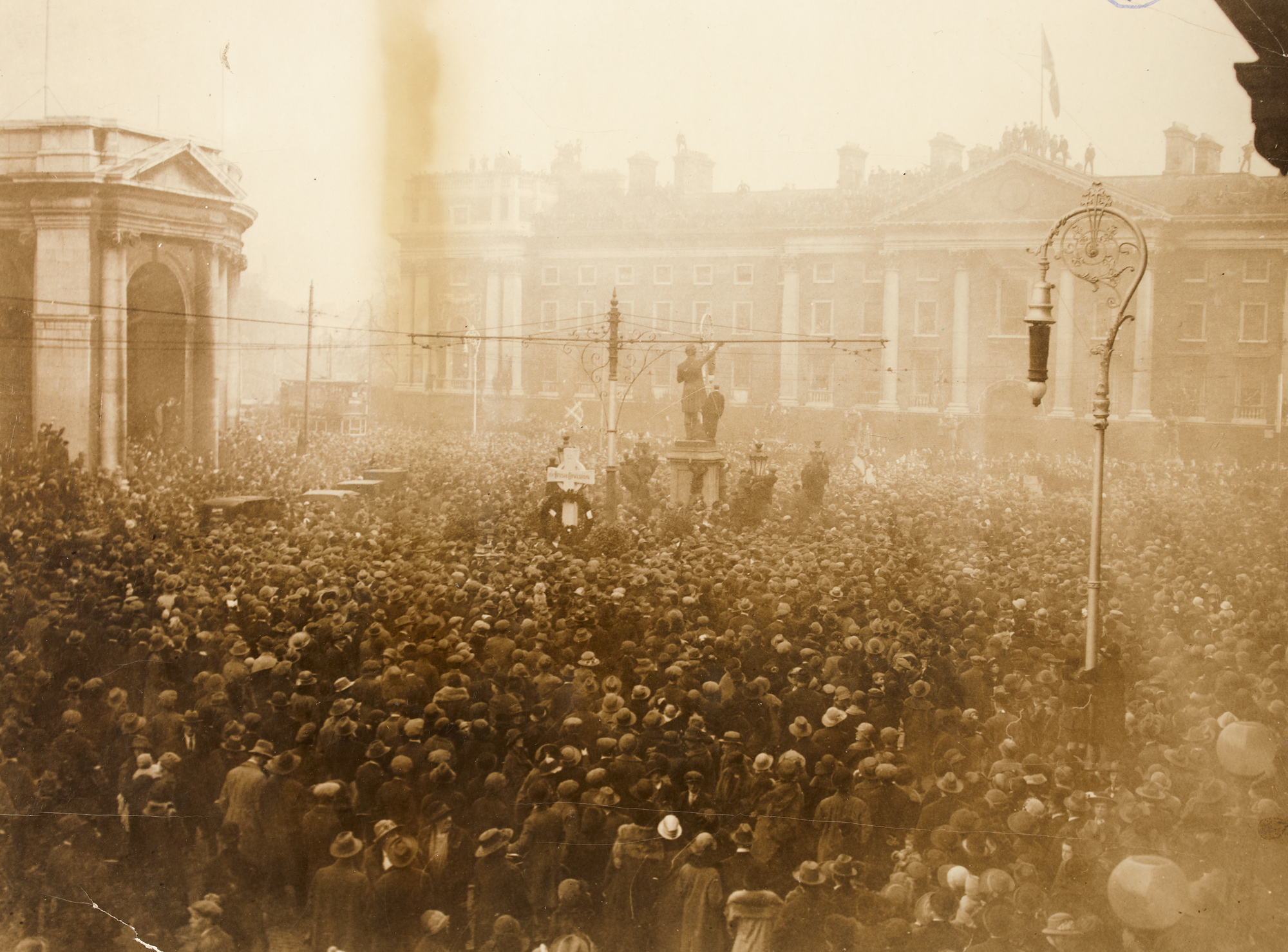
Crowd gathered in College Green for the unveiling of a Celtic Cross in memory of the 16th (Irish) Division, Armistice Day, 1924.

Moved by the fate of Belgium, a small and Catholic country, John Redmond had called on Irishmen to enlist "in defence of the highest principles of religion and morality and right". More Catholic Irish enlisted than Protestants.

The 16th Division began forming as part of the K2 Army Group towards the end of 1914 after Irish recruits in the early days of the war from England and Belfast first filled the ranks of the 10th (Irish) Division before being assigned to the 16th Division, formed around a core of National Volunteers. Initial training began in Ireland at Fermoy, Munster; recruits also trained at Buttevant. The division moved to Aldershot in Hampshire, England for more intensive training in September 1915. After thirteen weeks, the division was deployed to Étaples in France, joining the British Expeditionary Force (BEF), then commanded by Field Marshal Sir John French, but later replaced by General Sir Douglas Haig. From there the division left on 18 December for that part of the front in the Loos salient, under the command of Irish Major General William Hickie, who had distinguished himself earlier in the war as a staff officer and brigade commander, and spent the rest of the war on the Western Front.

Until March 1916 the 16th Division was part of IV Corps, commanded by the staunch unionist, Lieutenant General Sir Henry Wilson. Wilson, who had called the division "Johnnie Redmond's pets", inspected them over the course of a few days over Christmas 1915, noting that they "appear to be inferior" and that "at least 50p.c. are quite useless, old whiskey-sodden militiamen". Hickie agreed that he had "a political Divn of riff raff Redmondites". Wilson thought the 47th Brigade had "old officers, old & useless men, very bad musketry, rotten boots, and altogether a very poor show". Wilson reported to his superior, General Sir Charles Monro (6 January) that the division, despite having been training since September–October 1914, would not be fit to serve in an active part of the line for six weeks. Although–in the opinion of Wilson's biographer Keith Jeffery–political prejudice probably played a part in these views, Wilson also attributed much of the difference in quality between his divisions to training, especially of officers, in which he took a keen personal interest, opposing Haig's wish to delegate training from corps to division level. Hickie was–in public–much more diplomatic and tactful and spoke of the pride which his new command gave him.

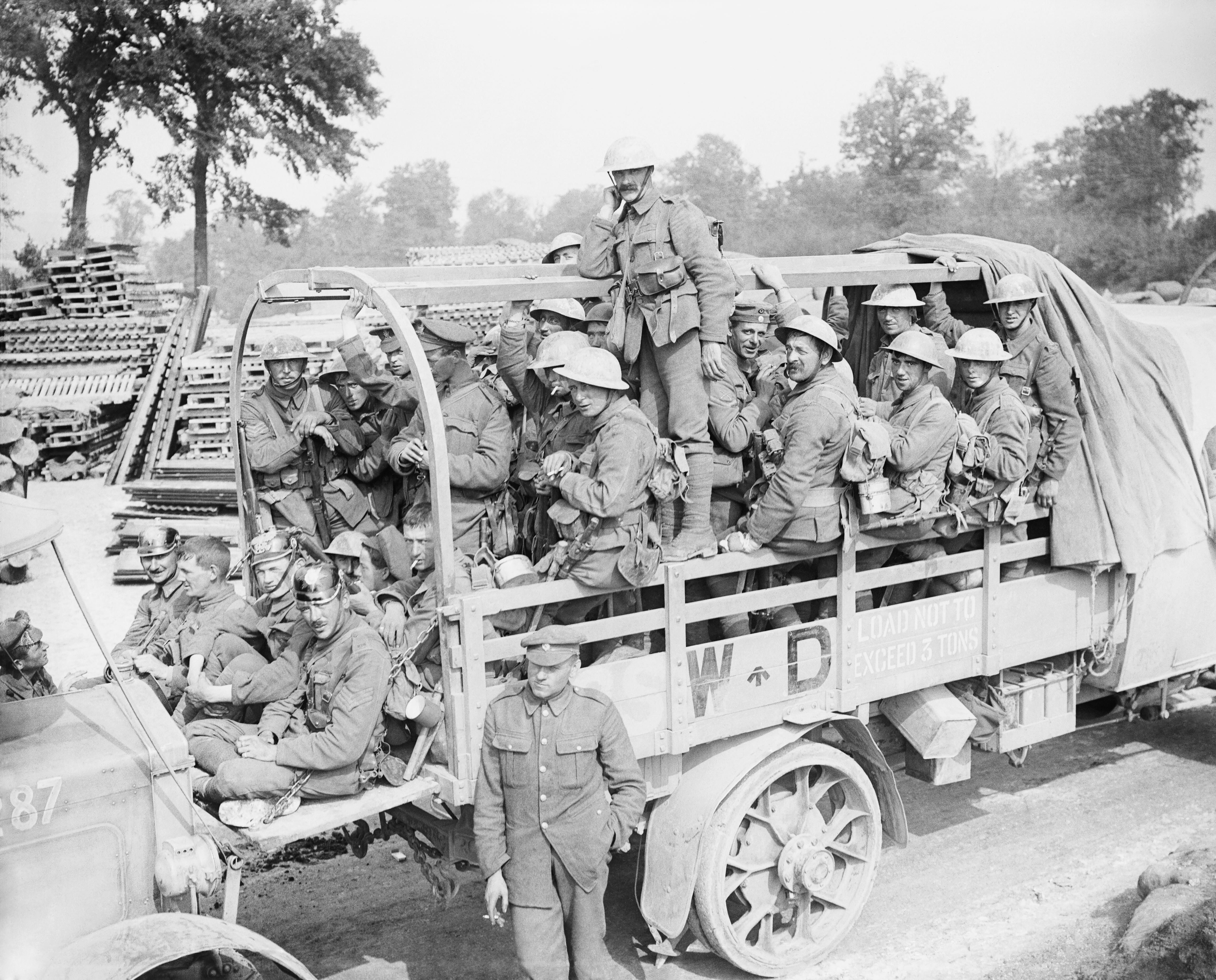
Men of the 16th (Irish) Division (possibly of the 47th Brigade) in a lorry going back for a rest after taking Guillemont, 3 September 1916. They are passing by the "Minden Post" on the Fricourt-Maricourt road, west-south-west of Carnoy. Note some soldiers wearing captured German pickelhaubes and feldmutzes. Two soldiers clearly display cap badges of the Royal Irish Regiment.

At Loos, in January and February 1916, the division was introduced to trench warfare and suffered greatly in the Battle of Hulluch. Personnel raided German trenches all through May and June. In late July they were moved to the Somme Valley where they were intensively engaged in the Battle of the Somme. Lieutenant General Hubert Gough, the British Fifth Army commander, had asked, at the end of 1915, for the division to be placed under his command, and had established the first corps school for the training of young officers. The 16th Division played an important part in capturing the towns of Guillemont and Ginchy, although they suffered massive casualties. During these successful actions between 1 and 10 September casualties amounted to 224 officers and 4,090 men; despite these very heavy losses the division gained a reputation as first-class shock troops. Out of a total of 10,845 men, it had lost 3,491 on the Loos sector between January and the end of May 1916, including heavy casualties from bombardment and a gas attack at Hullach in April. Bloodletting of this order was fatal to the division's character, for it had to be made good by drafts from England.

In early 1917, the division took a major part in the Battle of Messines alongside the 36th (Ulster) Division, adding to both their recognition and reputation. Their major actions ended in the summer of 1917 at the Battle of Passchendaele after, again, coming under the command of Gough and the Fifth Army. In July 1917, during the Third Battle of Ypres, although both divisions were completely exhausted after 13 days of moving weighty equipment under heavy shelling, Gough ordered the battalions to advance through deep mud towards well fortified German positions left untouched by totally inadequate artillery preparation. By mid August, the 16th had suffered over 4,200 casualties, the 36th almost 3,600, or more than 50% of their numbers. Haig, now a field marshal, was very critical of Gough for "playing the Irish card".

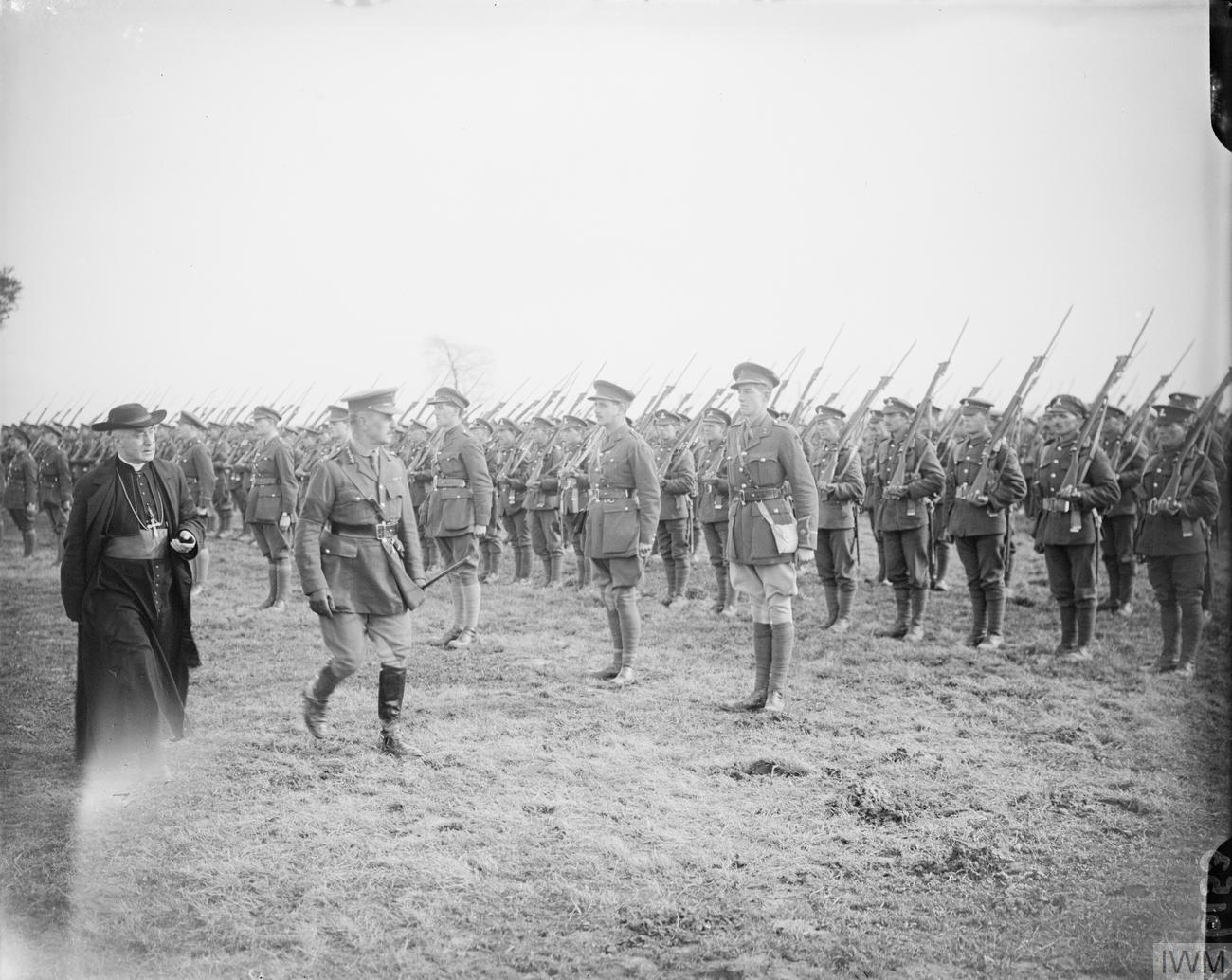
Cardinal Francis Bourne, the Head of the Catholic Church in England and Wales, and Major-General William Hickie, General Officer Commanding (GOC) 16th (Irish) Division, inspecting troops of the 8/9th (Service) Battalion, Royal Dublin Fusiliers at Ervillers, 27 October 1917.

The 16th Division held an exposed position from early 1918 at Ronssoy where they suffered more heavy losses during the German Army's Spring Offensive in March and being practically wiped out in the retreat which followed Operation Michael. Haig wrote in his diary (22 March 1918) that the division was "said not to be so full of fight as the others. In fact, certain Irish units did very badly and gave way immediately the enemy showed". In fact the division's casualties were the highest of any BEF division at this time, and records of the German 18th and 50th Reserve Divisions show that the Irish fought hard. The corps commander, Lieutenant General Walter Congreve, wrote "the real truth is that their reserve brigade did not fight at all and their right brigade very indifferently". One battalion was greeted at the rear with cries of "There go the Sinn Feiners!" A report by Field Marshal Sir Henry Wilson, now the Chief of the Imperial General Staff (CIGS), concluded that there was no evidence that the men had not fought well, but pointed out that only two-thirds of the men were of Irish birth. The matter affected the debate over the introduction of conscription of Ireland.

The remnants of the division were later transferred to XIX Corps of the Third Army. The 16th helped to finally halt the German attack prior to the Battle of Hamel. The decision was then made to break up the division, the three surviving Service battalions were posted to other formations.

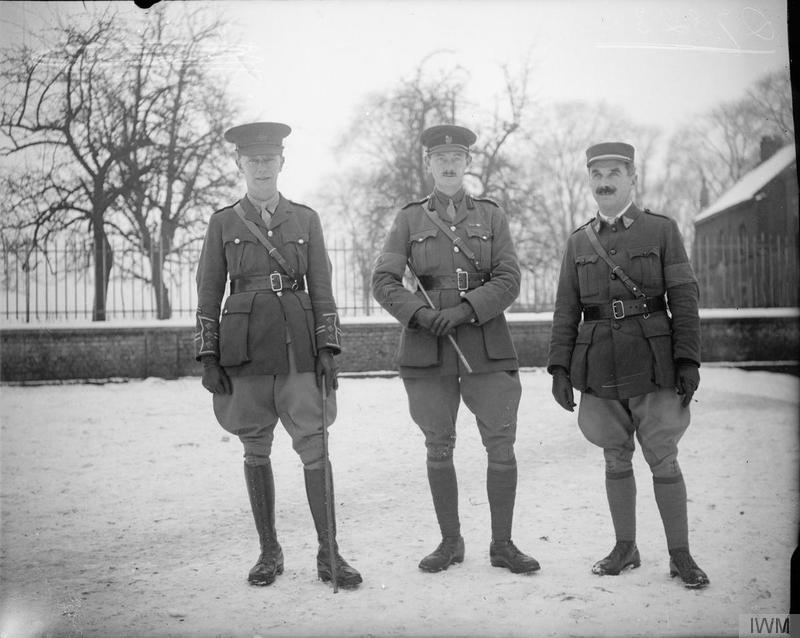
Headquarters of the 49th Infantry Brigade: the Brigade Major, the Education Officer and the Interpreter. January 1919.

On 14 June the division returned to England for reconstitution. The Conscription Crisis of 1918 in Ireland meant that fewer Irish recruits could be raised so that the 16th Division which returned to France on 27 July contained five English battalions, two Scottish battalions and one Welsh battalion. The only original battalion left was the 5th Royal Irish Fusiliers.

The dispersion of the Irish battalions throughout the BEF in 1918, despite its practical considerations, appears to suggest that the Irish units were increasingly distrusted by the military authorities.

== Order of battle ==
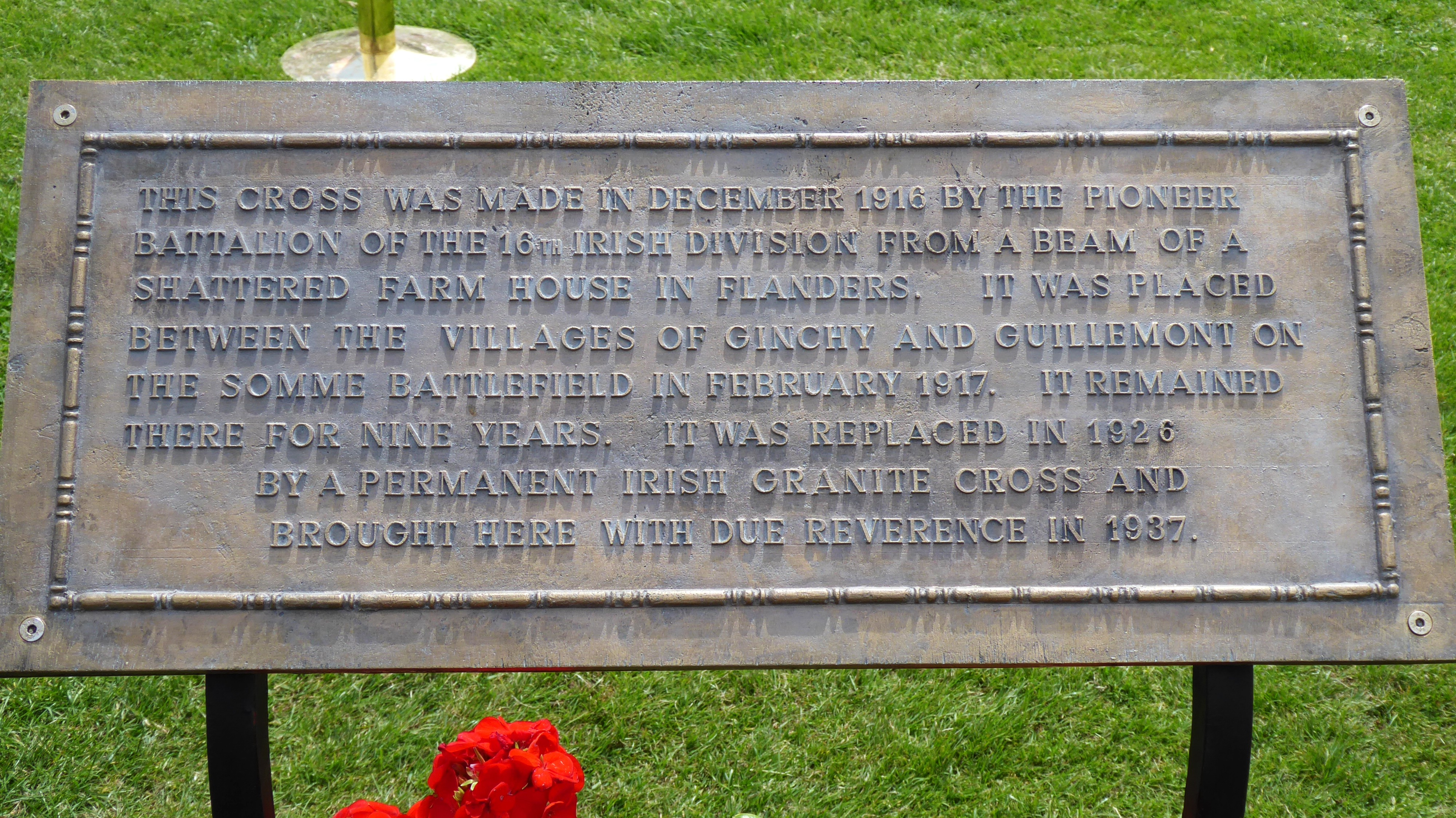
Plaque commemorating the 16th (Irish) Division's Somme Cross.

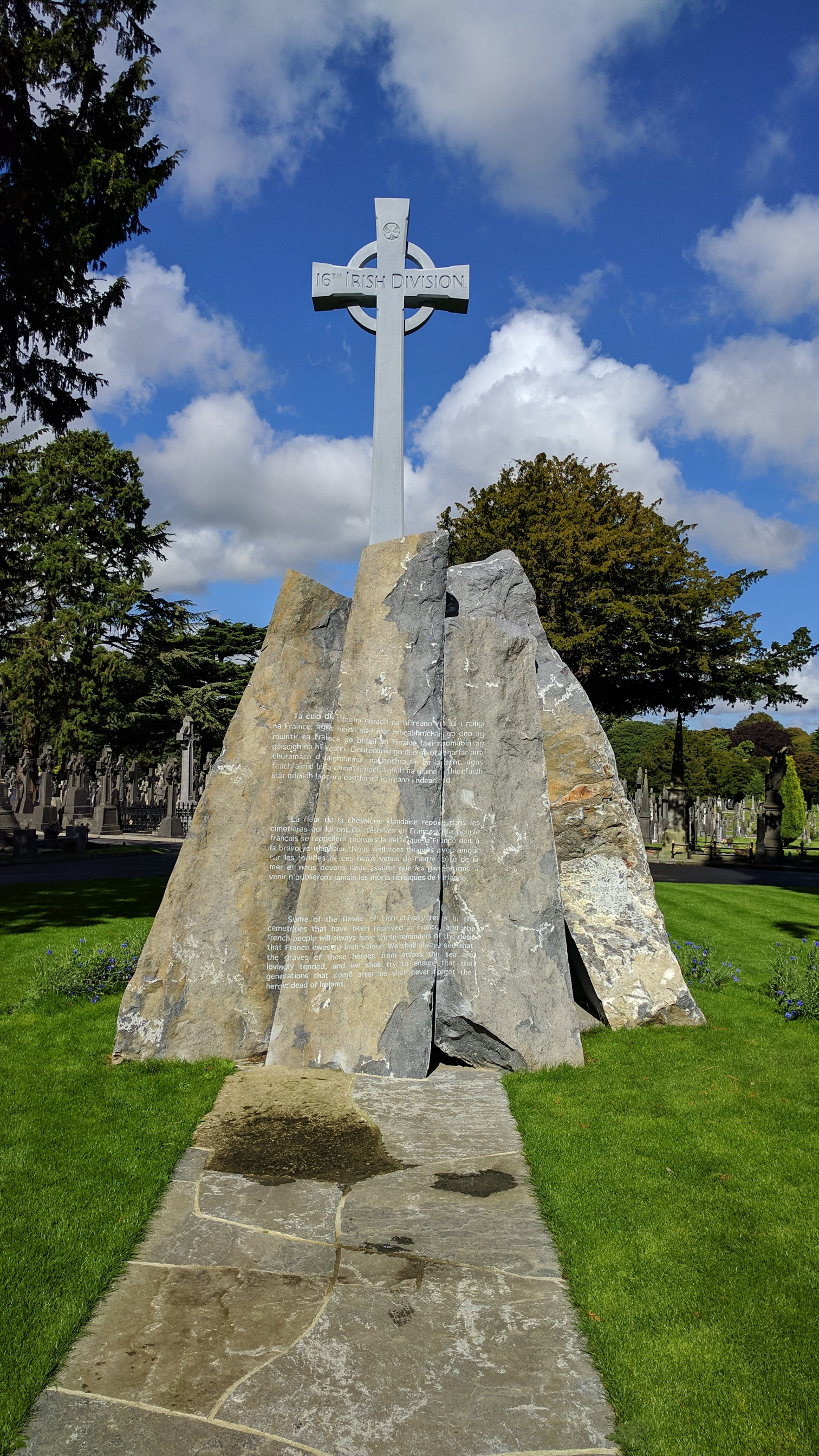
Memorial to the 16th Irish Division in Glasnevin Cemetery, 2016.

The 16th Division was composed of the following during World War I:

=== 47th Brigade ===
- 8th (Service) Battalion, Royal Munster Fusiliers (New Army) (disbanded 23 November 1916)
- 6th (Service) Battalion, Royal Irish Regiment (disbanded 9 February 1918)
- 7th (Service) Battalion, Prince of Wales's Leinster Regiment (Royal Canadians); (disbanded 31 July 1922)
- 6th (Service) Battalion, Connaught Rangers (left June 1918)
- 1st Battalion, Royal Munster Fusiliers (joined 22 November 1916 left 20 April 1918)
- 2nd Battalion, Leinster Regiment (joined 2 February 1918 left 23 April 1918)
- 18th (Service) Battalion Welsh Regiment (2nd Glamorgan), (joined May 1918)
- 14th (Service) Battalion, Leicestershire Regiment (joined 26 June 1918)
- 9th (Service) Battalion, Black Watch (Royal Highlanders) (joined 2 July 1918)
- 47th Machine Gun Company, Machine Gun Corps (M.G.C.) (joined 28 April 1916, moved to 16th Battalion, M.G.C. 9 March 1918)
- 47th Trench Mortar Battery (formed by 16 June 1916, reformed in England 1918)

The 47th Brigade was known as the "Nationalist Brigade" as the majority were men from Redmond's Irish Volunteers.

=== 48th Brigade ===
- 9th (Service) Battalion, Royal Munster Fusiliers (New Army) (disbanded 30 May 1916)
- 7th (Service) Battalion, Royal Irish Rifles (left 23 August 1917)
- 8th (Service) Battalion, Royal Dublin Fusiliers (merged with 9th Battalion 24 October 1917 renamed 8th/9th Battalion, disbanded 10 February 1918)
- 9th (Service) Battalion, Royal Dublin Fusiliers (merged with 8th Battalion 24 October 1917, )
- 1st Battalion, Royal Munster Fusiliers (joined 28 May 1916 left 22 November 1916)
- 10th (Service) Battalion, Royal Dublin Fusiliers (joined 23 June 1917, left 13 February 1918)
- 1st Battalion, Royal Dublin Fusiliers (joined 19 October 1917 left 26 April 1918)
- 2nd Battalion, Royal Munster Fusiliers (joined 3 February 1918 left 19 May 1918)
- 22nd (Service) Battalion, Northumberland Fusiliers (joined 2 June 1918)
- 11th (Service) Battalion, Royal Irish Fusiliers (joined 2 June 1918 left August 1918)
- 18th (Service) Battalion, Cameronians (Scottish Rifles) (joined 2 July 1918)
- 5th (Service) Battalion, Royal Irish Fusiliers (joined 24 August 1918)
- 48th Machine Gun Company (joined 28 April 1916, moved to 16th Battalion, M.G.C. 9 March 1918)
- 48th Trench Mortar Battery (formed by 24 June 1916, reformed in England 1918)

=== 49th Brigade ===
- 7th (Service) Battalion, Royal Irish Fusiliers (merged with 8th Battalion 15 October 1916, renamed as 7th/8th Battalion, disbanded February 1918)
- 8th (Service) Battalion, Royal Irish Fusiliers (merged with 7th Battalion 15 October 1916)
- 7th (Service) Battalion, Royal Inniskilling Fusiliers (merged with 8th Battalion 23 August 1917, renamed as 7th/8th Battalion, left 17 June 1918)
- 8th (Service) Battalion, Royal Inniskilling Fusiliers (merged with 7th Battalion 23 August 1917)
- 2nd Battalion, Royal Irish Regiment (joined 14 October 1916 left 23 April 1918)
- 7th (Service) Battalion, Royal Irish Regiment (South Irish Horse) Battalion,(joined 17 October 1917 left 17 July 1918)
- 34th (Service) Battalion, London Regiment (County of London) Battalion (joined 27 June 1918)
- 18th (Service) Battalion, Gloucestershire Regiment (joined 2 July 1918)
- 6th (Service) Battalion, Prince Albert's (Somerset Light Infantry)- (joined 4 July 1918)
- 49th Machine Gun Company, Machine Gun Corps (joined 29 April 1916, moved to 16th Battalion, M.G.C 9 March 1918)
- 49th Trench Mortar Battery (formed by 16 June 1916, reformed in England 1918)

=== Divisional troops ===
- 11th (Service) Battalion, Hampshire Regiment (joined 20 September 1914 as divisional pioneers)
- 269th Machine Gun Company M.G.C. (joined 18 January 1918, moved to 16th Battalion M.G.C. 9 March 1918)
- 16th Machine Gun Battalion M.G.C. (formed 9 March 1918, broken up 8 May 1918. A new 16th MG Battalion joined on 2 August 1918)
- 19th Entrenching Battalion (joined 4 April 1918, disbanded 5 May 1918. Troops went to 2nd Royal Munster Fusiliers)
- Divisional Mounted Troops
  - 16th Divisional Cyclist Company Army Cyclist Corps (joined 11 December 1914, disbanded 1 June 1916.)
  - C Squadron, South Irish Horse (joined January 1915, left 17 May 1916)
- 16th Divisional Train Army Service Corps
  - 142nd, 143rd, 144th and 145th Companies
- 217th Divisional Employment Company (formed by 30 June 1917)
- 47th Mobile Veterinary Section Army Veterinary Corps

=== Royal Artillery ===
- LXXIV Brigade Royal Field Artillery (R.F.A.) (left in July 1915 to join Guards Division)
- LXXV Brigade R.F.A. (as for LXXIV Brigade)
- LXXVI Brigade R.F.A. (as for LXXIV Brigade)
- LXXVII (H) Brigade R.F.A. (left in July 1915 but rejoined 22 February 1916, left 22 February 1917)
- CLXXVII Brigade R.F.A. (joined 22 February 1916)
- CLXXX Brigade R.F.A. (joined 22 February 1916)
- CLXXXII Brigade R.F.A. (joined 22 February 1916, broken up 27 August 1916)
- 16th Divisional Ammunition Column R.F.A. (left in August 1915 to join Guards Division. Replaced 22 February 1916)
- 16th Heavy Battery Royal Garrison Artillery (raised for the Division but moved independently to France in July 1915)
- X.16, Y.16 and Z.16 Medium Trench Mortar Batteries R.F.A. (joined by June 1916. Z.16 broken up 27 February 1918. X.16 and Y.16 broken up 20 April 1918)
- V.16 Heavy Trench Mortar Battery R.F.A. (joined 5 September 1916, left February 1918)

=== Royal Engineers ===
- 75th Field Company (left 13 August 1915 to join Guards Division)
- 76th Field Company (left 13 August 1915 to join Guards Division)
- 16th Divisional Signal (left 13 August 1915 to join Guards Division, a new Company joined in September 1915)
- 95th Field Company (joined 30 January 1915 from 26th Division, left 17 August 1915 to join 7th Division)
- 155th Field Company (joined August 1915)
- 156th Field Company (joined August 1915)
- 157th Field Company (joined August 1915)

=== Royal Army Medical Corps ===
- 48th Field Ambulance (left June 1915 and joined 37th Division)
- 49th Field Ambulance (as for 48th Coy.)
- 50th Field Ambulance (as for 48th Coy.)
- 111th Field Ambulance (joined September 1915)
- 112th Field Ambulance (joined September 1915)
- 113th Field Ambulance (joined September 1915)
- 81st Sanitary Section (joined before embarkation, left for IX Corps in April 1917)

== General officers commanding ==
The following officers commanded the division at various times:

Appointed	General officer commanding
1914	Major-General Lawrence Parsons
December 1915	Major-General William Hickie
February 1918	Major-General Charles Hull
May 1918	Major-General Archibald Ritchie

== Legacy ==
In the French village of Guillemont there is a celtic cross memorial in remembrance of the division. In 2016 a centenary ceremony was held to commemorate the division's participation in the Battle of the Somme. It was attended by representatives of both the British and Irish governments.

At Wytschaete Cemetery, Belgium, there are two memorial stones facing opposite one another dedicated to the 36th Ulster Division and 16th Irish Division, in order to commemorate their fighting together during the Battle of Messines Ridge. There is also a celtic cross memorial at the same location.

== See also ==
- List of British divisions in World War I
- 10th (Irish) Division
- 36th (Ulster) Division

== Battles ==
- Battle of Hulluch
- Battle of the Somme (1916)
- Battle of Guillemont
- Battle of Ginchy
- Battle of Messines (1917)
- Third Battle of Ypres

== Great War Memorials ==
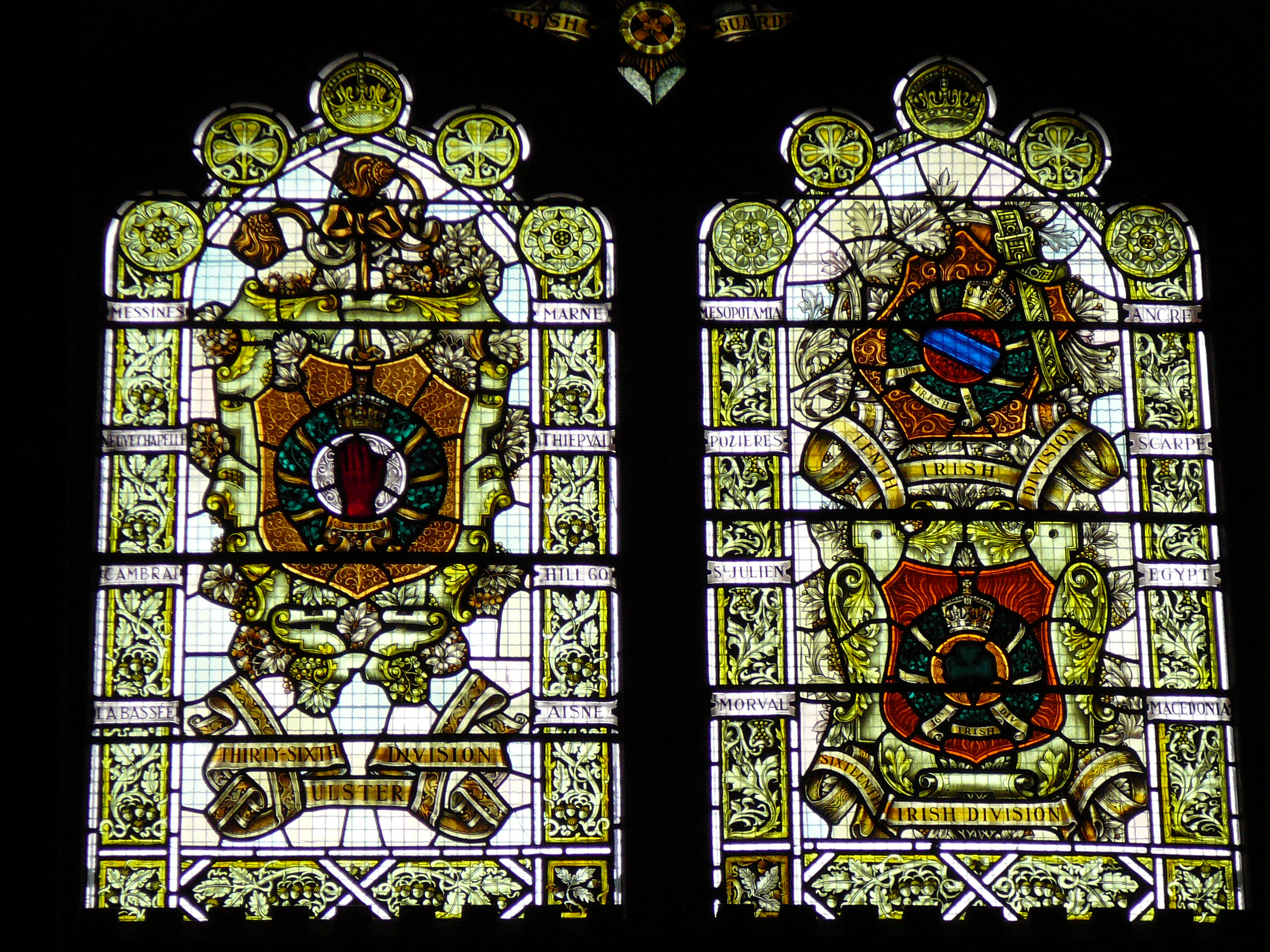
Guildhall Derry stained-glass window which commemorates the three Irish Divisions, left the 36th, right the 10th and 16th.

- Irish National War Memorial Gardens, Dublin.
- Island of Ireland Peace Park Messines, Belgium.
- Ulster Tower Memorial Thiepval, France.
- Menin Gate Memorial Ypres, Belgium.

== References and further reading ==
- Bartlet, Thomas & Jeffery, Keith: A Military History of Ireland, Cambridge University Press (1996) (2006), ISBN 978-0-521-62989-8
- Bowen, Desmond & Jean: Heroic Option: The Irish in the British Army, Pen & Sword Books (2005), ISBN 978-1-84415-152-3.
- Cooper, Bryan (1918): The 10th (Irish) Division in Gallipoli, Irish Academic Press (1993), (2003). ISBN 978-0-7165-2517-2.
- Denman, Terence: Ireland's Unknown Soldiers: the 16th (Irish) Division in the Great War, Irish Academic Press (1992), (2003) ISBN 978-0-7165-2495-3.
- Dooley, Thomas P.: Irishmen or English Soldiers? : the Times of a Southern Catholic Irish Man (1876–1916), Liverpool Press (1995), ISBN 978-0-85323-600-9.
- Dungan, Myles: They Shall not Grow Old: Irish Soldiers in the Great War, Four Courts Press (1997), ISBN 978-1-85182-347-5.
- Farrar-Hockley, General Sir Anthony (1975). Goughie. London: Granada. ISBN -0246640596.
- Grayson, Dr. Richard S.: Belfast Boys – How Unionists and Nationalists fought and died together in the First World War, Continuum UK, London (2009) ISBN 978-1-84725-008-7
- Horne, John ed.: Our War 'Ireland and the Great War': The Thomas Davis Lectures, The Royal Irish Academy, Dublin (2008) ISBN 978-1-904890-50-8
- Jeffrey, Keith: Ireland and the Great War, Press Syndicate of the University of Cambridge (2000), ISBN 978-0-521-77323-2.
- Jeffery, Keith (2006). Field Marshal Sir Henry Wilson: A Political Soldier. Oxford University Press. ISBN 978-0-19-820358-2.
- Kitchen, Martin (2001). The German Offensives of 1918. Tempus. ISBN 0-7524-1799-1.
- Moore, Steven: The Irish on the Somme (2005), ISBN 978-0-9549715-1-9.
- Murphy, David: Irish Regiments in the World Wars, Osprey Publishing (2007), ISBN 978-1-84603-015-4
- Murphy, David: The Irish Brigades, 1685–2006, A gazetteer of Irish Military Service past and present,
  Four Courts Press (2007) The Military Heritage of Ireland Trust. ISBN 978-1-84682-080-9
- Prior, Robin & Wilson, Trevor. (1997). Passchendaele: The Untold Story. Yale University Press.
- Maxwell Staniforth, At war with the 16th Irish Division 1914-1918 : the Staniforth letters
- Walker, Stephen: Forgotten Soldiers; The Irishmen shot at dawn Gill & Nacmillan (2007), ISBN 978-0-7171-4182-1
