= 49th Brigade (United Kingdom) =

Military unit

The 49th Brigade was a formation of British Army. It was part of the new army also known as Kitchener's Army. It was assigned to the 16th (Irish) Division and served on the Western Front during the First World War.

== Formation ==
The infantry battalions did not all serve at once, but all were assigned to the brigade during the war.

- 7th Battalion, Royal Irish Fusiliers
- 9th Battalion, Royal Irish Fusiliers
- 7th Battalion, Royal Inniskilling Fusiliers
- 8th Battalion, Royal Inniskilling Fusiliers
- 2nd Battalion, Royal Irish Regiment
- 7th Battalion, Royal Irish Regiment
- 34th Battalion, London Regiment
- 7th Battalion, King's Royal Rifle Corps
- 5th Battalion, Oxfordshire and Buckinghamshire Light Infantry
- 13th Battalion, Duke of Cornwall's Light Infantry
- 7th Battalion, Royal Dublin Fusiliers
- 6/7th Battalion, Royal Scots Fusiliers
- 18th Battalion, Gloucestershire Regiment
- 6th Battalion, Somerset Light Infantry
- 49th Machine Gun Company
- 49th Trench Mortar Battery
