= General Potter =

General Potter may refer to:

- Edward E. Potter (1823–1889), Union Army brigadier general and brevet major general
- Herbert Cecil Potter (1875–1964), British Army brigadier general
- James Potter (Pennsylvania politician) (1729–1789), Pennsylvania Militia brigadier general in the American Revolutionary War
- Joseph H. Potter (1822–1892), Union Army brigadier general
- Laura Potter (fl. 1980s–2020s), U.S. Army lieutenant general
- Lorraine K. Potter (born 1946), U.S. Air Force major general
- Robert Brown Potter (1829–1887), Union Army major general

== See also ==
- Attorney General Potter (disambiguation)
