= 9th Infantry Brigade (United Kingdom) =

- Active: 1914-1918; 1939-1945
- Country: United Kingdom
- Branch: British Army
- Type: Infantry
- Role: Infantry brigade
- Size: Brigade
- Part of: 3rd Infantry Division
- Engagements: First World War; Second World War

Commanders
- Notable commanders: Bernard Montgomery; Brian Horrocks

Insignia
- Abbreviation: 9th Inf Bde

The 9th Infantry Brigade was a Regular Army infantry brigade of the British Army that saw active service during both the First and Second World Wars.

== History ==
=== Anglo-Russian invasion of Holland ===
A 9th Infantry Brigade was formed in 1799 for the Anglo-Russian invasion of Holland, and was commanded by Major-General Robert Manners. It comprised:

- 1st Battalion, 9th Regiment of Foot
- 2nd Battalion, 9th Regiment of Foot
- 56th Regiment of Foot
- 2 squadrons of the 7th Light Dragoons.

The brigade took part in the clash at Zijpersluis on 10 September 1799, the Battle of Bergen on 19 September, the Battle of Egmond aan Zee on 2 October and the Battle of Castricum on 6 October.

=== Second Boer War ===
A 9th Infantry brigade was formed during the Second Boer War, under the command of Major-General Reginald Pole-Carew from November 1899 until February 1900. They took part in the Battle of Modder River on 28 November 1899, as part of a force sent to relieve the Siege of Kimberley. A battalion of the Yorkshire Light Infantry served in the brigade.

=== First World War ===
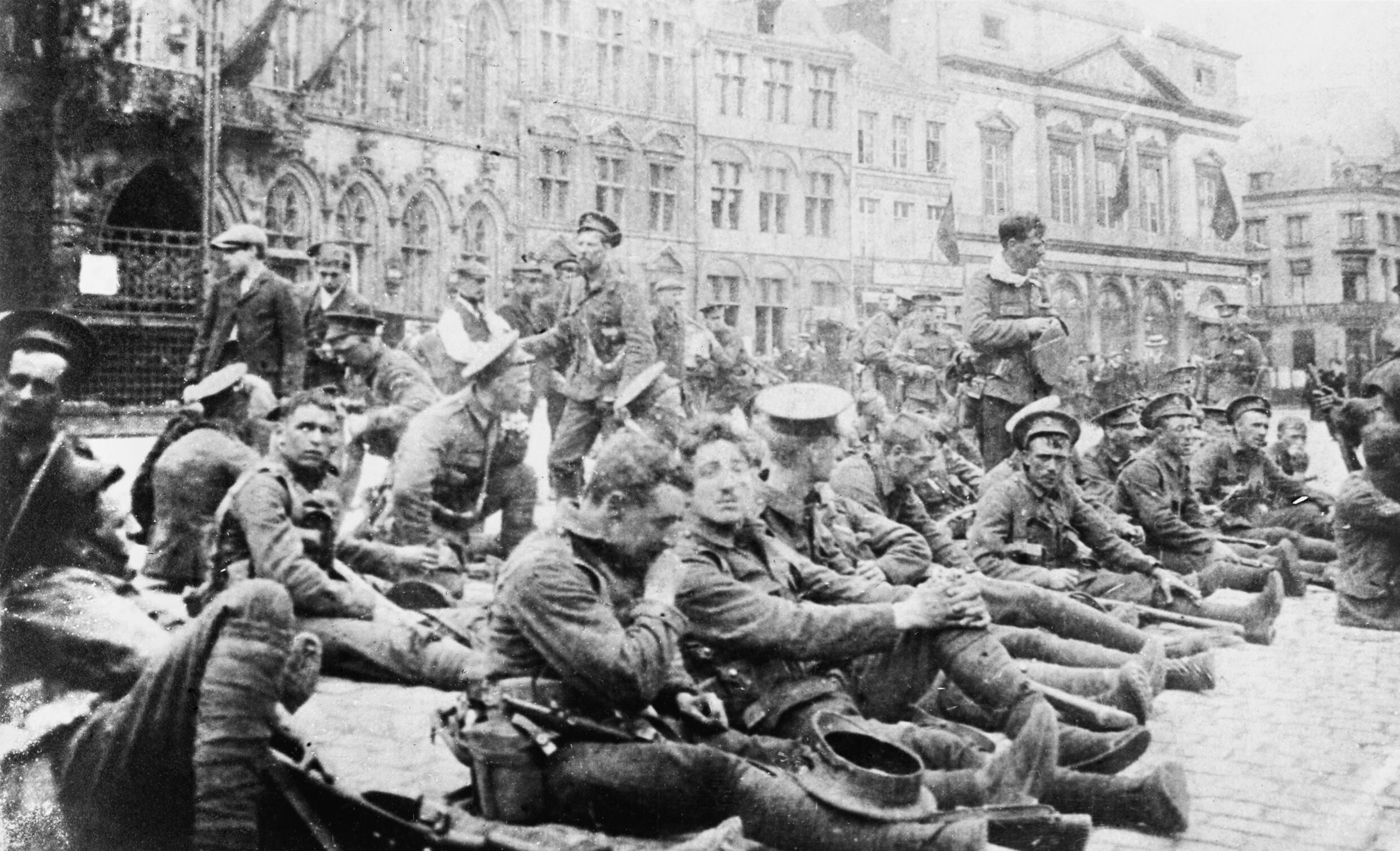
Men of "A" Company of the 4th Battalion, Royal Fusiliers on 22 August 1914, resting in the square at Mons, Belgium, the day before the Battle of Mons. Minutes after this photo was taken the company moved into position at Nimy on the bank of the Mons-Condé Canal.

During the First World War, 9th Brigade's composition was as follows:

- 1st Battalion, Northumberland Fusiliers
- 4th Battalion, Royal Fusiliers
- 1st Battalion, Lincolnshire Regiment (until November 1915)
- 1st Battalion, Royal Scots Fusiliers (until April 1916, then to 8th Brigade)
- 1/10th (Scottish) Battalion, King's (Liverpool Regiment) (from November 1914 to January 1916)
- 12th (Service) Battalion, West Yorkshire Regiment (from November 1915 to February 1918)
- 13th (Service) Battalion, King's (Liverpool Regiment) (joined from 8th Brigade in April 1916)
- 9th Brigade Machine Gun Company (formed in February 1916, joined the 3rd MG Battalion, Machine Gun Corps in March 1918)
- 9th Trench Mortar Battery (joined by May 1916)

The brigade served with the 3rd Division throughout the war, except for a brief a period in early 1915 when it exchanged places with the 85th Brigade of 28th Division.

==== Commanders ====
The commanders of the 9th Infantry Brigade during the First World War were:

- Brigadier-General F. C. Shaw (At mobilization)
- Brigadier-General W. Douglas Smith (12 November 1914)
- Brigadier-General H. C. Potter (9 March 1916)
- Brigadier-General H. C. R. Green (26 July 1916)
- Brigadier-General H. C. Potter (5 August 1916)

=== Second World War ===
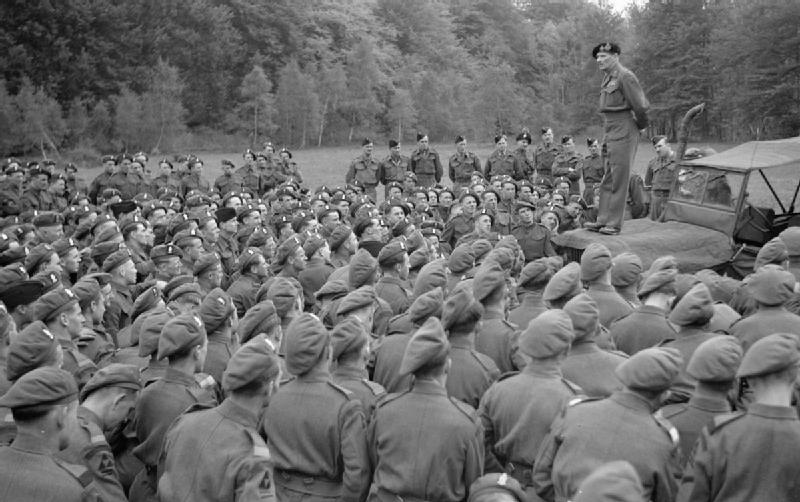
General Sir Bernard Montgomery standing on the bonnet of a jeep speaking to troops of 2nd Battalion, Royal Ulster Rifles, after carrying out an inspection of the battalion near Portsmouth in the run-up to D-Day. The battalion had previously served in his division earlier in the war.

The 9th Infantry Brigade together with 7th Infantry Brigade and 8th Infantry Brigade formed the 3rd Infantry Division, which, at the outbreak of the Second World War in September 1939, was commanded by Major-General Bernard Montgomery. With the division the brigade was sent to France in October 1939, shortly after the outbreak of war, as part of the British Expeditionary Force, which evacuated from Dunkirk. After the evacuation, the Brigade spent four years training in the UK, in preparation for an eventual assault landing in Europe. The 3rd Infantry Division was the first British division to land at Sword on D-Day and fought through the Battle of Normandy, the Netherlands and later the invasion of Germany. During the often intense fighting from Sword to Bremen, the Division suffered 2,586 killed.

The brigade comprised:

- 2nd Battalion, Lincolnshire Regiment
- 1st Battalion, King's Own Scottish Borderers
- 2nd Battalion, Royal Ulster Rifles

== Sources ==
- Joslen, H. F. (2003) [1960]. Orders of Battle: Second World War, 1939–1945. Uckfield, East Sussex: Naval and Military Press. ISBN 978-1-84342-474-1.
