= Herbert Cecil Potter =

Brigadier-General Herbert Cecil Potter CB CMG DSO
- Born: 10 October 1875; Nagasaki, Japan
- Died: 11 June 1964 (aged 88); Cheltenham, England
- Military career
- Allegiance: United Kingdom
- Branch: British Army
- Service years: 1896−1927
- Rank: Brigadier-General
- Unit: King's Regiment (Liverpool)
- Commands: 1st Battalion, King's Regiment (Liverpool); 9th Brigade
- Conflicts: Second Boer War; World War I
- Awards: Companion of the Order of the Bath; Companion of the Order of St Michael and St George; Distinguished Service Order; Mentioned in dispatches

Brigadier-General Herbert Cecil Potter, CB, CMG, DSO (10 October 1875 – 11 June 1964) was a senior British Army officer, 'Military Chief' of Belfast and Colonel Commandant of the 3rd Indian Infantry Brigade, Peshawar. A catalogue of Potter's papers described him as a 'quintessential member of the British officer class'.

== Early life ==
Hebert Cecil Potter was born in Nagasaki in Japan on 10 October 1875, the son of Frederick Anthony Potter and Florence Bessie Marshall (née Higgins). He was educated at Bedford Modern School and Sandhurst.

== Military career ==
After Sandhurst, Potter joined the King's Liverpool Regiment as a second lieutenant on 29 February 1896, was promoted to lieutenant on 2 March 1899 and to captain on 5 December 1900. He was seconded for service in South Africa in November 1901, during the Second Boer War, and served there with a Mounted Infantry column. Staying in South Africa until after the end of the war in June 1902, he left Cape Town on the SS Orient in October that year.

He was on 28 March 1903 appointed as Charles Harington's successor as an adjutant.

He later served in Sudan (1908) and throughout World War I on the Western Front.

At the start of the war Potter was under no illusion about the task ahead, writing to his mother on 16 August 1914 that he hoped 'to come home safe and sound from the war although many will not, very many. The Germans seem to have gone mad and appear to wish to fight everyone at once'. Within a month of writing that letter he was 'temporarily out of action slightly wounded thro' both legs'.

Potter, promoted in September 1915 to major, was again on active service in 1916, where, after being promoted to the temporary rank of brigadier general in March, he succeeded Major General William Douglas Smith in command of the 9th Infantry Brigade, which he commanded during the Battle of the Somme, the Battle of Arras, and the Battle of Passchendaele. He was twice wounded at the Somme in August 1916, the second time by a 'large shell which sat down beside me and made me stone deaf for some days'. At the end of the war, Potter expressed his joy of Allied Victory in a letter written to his wife dated 16 November 1918: 'We can scarcely realise yet what a wonderful victory God has given us. And it all came almost like a miracle. I've never waivered [sic] in my belief that God would not allow the Bosches to win'.

In February 1922, Potter was made 'Military Chief' in Belfast. On his appointment Potter commented: ‘My advent here was heralded by newspaper posters all over the place. ‘’New Military Chief For Belfast’’. I Crept past these as, I imagine, a murderer does past the posters of his crime!’ He was later colonel commandant, 3rd Infantry Brigade, Peshawar.

Potter retired from the army on full pay in 1927.

== Awards and honours ==
Potter received the Queen's medal and three clasps in the Second Boer War (1901–02). He was awarded a medal and clasp, 4th Class Osmanieh, 3rd Class Mejidieh in Sudan (1908). During World War I Potter was mentioned in despatches, decorated with the Legion of Honour by Sir Douglas Haig in November 1915, made DSO in 1917 and CMG in 1918 . On the reason for his award of the Legion of Honour he wrote '...for trying to do my job, I suppose'.

Potter was made Companion Order of the Bath in 1927.

== Family life ==
In 1913 at Temple Church, Bristol, Potter married Mary Kingston (née Griffith) who predeceased him. There was one son (Cecil) and two daughters (Eileen and Joan) from the marriage. Potter's brother, Frederick William Potter, was also born in Nagasaki and became Chief Engineer of the Shanghai Gas Company.

Potter died on 11 June 1964 in Cheltenham, Gloucestershire.

== Bibliography ==
- Davies, Frank (1997). Bloody Red Tabs: General Officer Casualties of the Great War 1914–1918. London: Pen & Sword Books. ISBN 978-0-85052-463-5.
