= Charles Hull (British Army officer) =

British Army officer

Major-General Sir Charles Hull KCB
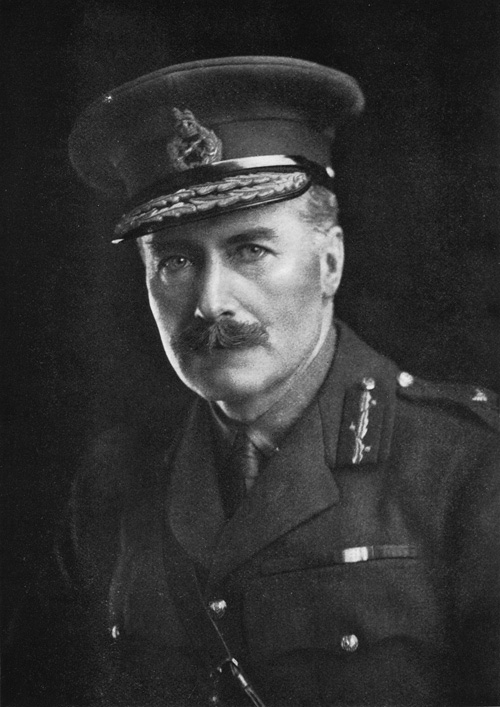
- Born: 3 July 1865; Kensington, London, England
- Died: 24 July 1920 (aged 55); Middlesex, England
- Relatives: Sir Richard Hull
- Military career
- Allegiance: United Kingdom
- Branch: British Army
- Service years: 1887–1920
- Rank: Major-General
- Units: York and Lancaster Regiment; Royal Scots Fusiliers; Middlesex Regiment
- Commands: 4th Battalion, Middlesex Regiment; 10th Infantry Brigade; 56th (1/1st London) Division; 16th (Irish) Division; 43rd (Wessex) Division
- Conflicts: Second Boer War; World War I
- Awards: Knight Commander of the Order of the Bath

Major General Sir Charles Patrick Amyatt Hull, KCB (3 July 1865 – 24 July 1920) was a senior British Army officer who served during the Second Boer War and World War I. He was the father of Field Marshal Sir Richard Hull and the grandfather of Lieutenant General Richard Swinburn.

== Early life ==
Hull, born on 3 July 1865 in Kensington, London, the son of Henry Charles Hull and his wife Frances Amelia Hull, was educated at Charterhouse School and later at Trinity College, Cambridge.

== Early military career ==
Hull was commissioned as a subaltern, with the rank of lieutenant, into the 3rd (Militia) Battalion, York and Lancaster Regiment, in April 1886. He transferred to the Royal Scots Fusiliers, and the Regular Army, in November 1887 as a second lieutenant.

He was promoted to lieutenant on 10 September 1890, and to captain on 24 February 1897. Appointed adjutant of his regiment's 2nd Battalion on 23 January 1899, he was among the officers in charge as the battalion was sent to South Africa in late October 1899, following the outbreak of the Second Boer War. He was wounded at the Battle of the Tugela Heights in late February 1900, as his battalion took part in the relief of Ladysmith. He was promoted to brevet major in November 1900.

After having returned to Britain, he attended the Staff College, Camberley, as a student from January 1902. Shortly after completion of the course, he was made a brigade major of the 11th Infantry Brigade in November 1903. He was promoted from captain, to which he had been promoted in June 1903, and brevet major to major in December 1908. He then served as a general staff officer, grade 2 (GSO2) at the Staff College from March 1909 and was granted the temporary rank of lieutenant colonel while serving in this position.

In February 1912 he was transferred to the Middlesex Regiment where he received a promotion to the substantive rank of lieutenant colonel and became commanding officer (CO) of the 4th Battalion, Middlesex Regiment.

== First World War ==
He was still CO of the 4th Middlesex Regiment in August 1914, the same month of the British entry into World War I. He led his battalion, which formed part of the 8th Infantry Brigade of the 3rd Division of the British Expeditionary Force (BEF), "through the first battle at Mons and the helter-skelter retreat to the Marne" in September, followed by the First Battle of Ypres which started in October and continued until November.

Upon being promoted to temporary brigadier general on 13 November, (later amended to 18 November) he went on to be general officer commanding (GOC) of the 10th Infantry Brigade after Brigadier General Norman McMahon was killed before he could take up the appointment, who in turn took over from Major General Aylmer Haldane. Hull, promoted in February 1915 to brevet colonel, would command the brigade, part of the 4th Division, throughout the rest of the year, most notably at the Second Battle of Ypres in the spring of 1915, and into early 1916.

After receiving a further promotion to temporary major general in February 1916, and to substantive colonel the same month, Hull became GOC of the 56th (1/1st London) Division, a Territorial Force (TF) formation which, under his command, "certainly had a reputation for getting things done". He was appointed a Companion of the Order of the Bath (CB) in June 1916, "for services rendered in connection with Military Operations in the Field". He commanded the division for the next two years, perhaps most notably during the attack on the Gommecourt Salient, part of the Battle of the Somme, in July 1916. His rank of major general became substantive in January 1917, "for distinguished service in the field".

After a period of recovery following major surgery in the United Kingdom in the autumn and winter of 1917, his CB was upgraded to a Knight Commander of the Order of the Bath in January 1918, and he became GOC of the 16th (Irish) Division on the Western Front in February, which he led during the German spring offensives where it sustained over 7,000 casualties.

However, he returned to the 56th Division in May, and served once again as its GOC for the remainder of the war. Hull, described as a "vigorous and aggressive commander", who "was popular with his division and was not afraid to visit the front line on a regular basis", led the 56th Division during the Hundred Days Offensive which ultimately led to the Armistice with Germany and finally brought hostilities to an end.

== Post-war and final years ==
He remained in command of the 56th Division until it was demobilised in March 1919 and was transferred to become GOC 43rd (Wessex) Division, another TF formation, in June.

He retired from the army in 1920 before his death at the relatively early age of 55 in July that year.

Military offices
Preceded by William Fry	GOC 56th (1/1st London) Division; 1916–1917	Succeeded by William Smith
Preceded by William Hickie	GOC 16th (Irish) Division; February – May 1918	Succeeded by Archibald Ritchie
Preceded by Frederick Dudgeon	GOC 56th (1/1st London) Division; 1918–1919	Succeeded by Sir Cecil Pereira
Preceded by Colin Donald	GOC 43rd (Wessex) Infantry Division; 1919–1920	Succeeded by Sir Louis Bols
