= Attorney General Potter =

Attorney General Potter may refer to:

- Charles N. Potter (1852–1927), Attorney General of Wyoming
- William W. Potter (Michigan politician) (1869–1940), Attorney General of Michigan
