= William Douglas Smith =

British Army general (1865–1939)

Major-General Sir William Douglas Smith KCB KCVO
- Portrait by Walter Stoneman, 1918
- Born: William Douglas Smith; 24 March 1865; Stonehouse, Plymouth, Devon, England
- Died: 4 February 1939 (aged 73); Kensington, London, England
- Military career
- Allegiance: United Kingdom
- Branch: British Army
- Service years: 1885–1924
- Rank: Major-General
- Unit: Royal Scots Fusiliers
- Commands: 56th (1/1st London) Division
- Conflicts: World War I
- Awards: Knight Commander of the Order of the Bath; Knight Commander of the Royal Victorian Order

Major-General Sir William Douglas Smith KCB KCVO (24 March 1865 – 4 February 1939) was a British Army officer who became Lieutenant Governor of Jersey.

== Military career ==
Smith was the son of Lt.-Col. Andrew William Douglas Smith, Royal Marines and Myra Elizabeth Luxmoore, an artist. After attending the Royal Military College, Sandhurst, Smith was commissioned into the Royal Scots Fusiliers as a lieutenant on 29 August 1885. He took part in the Burma expedition in 1886, was promoted to captain on 14 November 1894, and took part in the Tirah campaign in 1897. He was made an adjutant in September 1898.

He was promoted to major on 14 December 1902, while serving with the 1st Battalion of his regiment stationed in Allahabad, British India. He was appointed a brigade major in India in 1905 and, on 1 July 1911, after being promoted to lieutenant colonel, served as commanding officer (CO) of the 1st Battalion, Royal Scots Fusiliers.

He served in the First World War, being promoted to the temporary rank of brigadier general on 11 November 1914 and taking command of the 9th Infantry Brigade, part of the 3rd Division, which was serving on the Western Front. He was appointed a Companion of the Order of the Bath in February 1915. He was promoted to substantive colonel on 1 July 1915, although with his seniority dating back to 14 December 1914. On 8 March 1916 he was promoted to temporary major general and became general officer commanding (GOC) of the 20th (Light) Division, and then as GOC 56th (1/1st London) Division, both of which were also serving on the Western Front. After receiving a promotion to the substantive rank of major general in January 1917, "for distinguished services in the field", he took command of the 56th Division on a temporary basis between 24 July and 9 August 1917 after his predecessor, Major General Charles Hull, had been taken ill and until a permanent appointment could be made.

After the war he became commander of Portsmouth Garrison and then lieutenant governor of Jersey before relinquishing this appointment in March 1924 and retiring from the army the same month.

== Family ==
He married Kathleen Edith Beyts and had one daughter.

Military offices
Preceded by Charles Hull	GOC 56th (1/1st London) Division; July 1917 – August 1917	Succeeded by Frederick Dudgeon
Government offices
Preceded by Sir Alexander Wilson	Lieutenant Governor of Jersey; 1920–1924	Succeeded by Sir Francis Bingham
