= Albert Shepherd =

Albert Shepherd may refer to:

- Albert Shepherd (footballer), English footballer
- Albert Shepherd (actor), English actor
- Albert Edward Shepherd, English recipient of the Victoria Cross
