= 20th (Light) Division =

- 20th (Light) Division sign, used on notice boards and signs.
- Active: September 1914 – May 1919
- Country: United Kingdom
- Branch: British Army
- Type: Infantry
- Engagements: World War I Battle of Loos Battle of Mont Sorrel Battle of the Somme (1916) Battle of Guillemont Battle of Flers-Courcelette Battle of Morval Battle of Le Transloy Third Battle of Ypres Battle of Langemarck (1917) Battle of Cambrai (1917) First Battle of the Somme (1918)

The 20th (Light) Division was an infantry division of the British Army, part of Kitchener's Army, raised in the First World War. The division was formed in September 1914 as part of the K2 Army Group. The division landed in France July 1915 and spent the duration of the First World War in action on the Western Front. The division was disbanded after the end of the war in early 1919.

== History ==
=== 1914–15 ===
==== Formation and training ====
The 20th (Light) Division was authorised on 11 September 1914 and was to be composed of newly raised battalions from quick marching rifle and light infantry regiments. The 59th (Note: 10th and 11th battalions King's Royal Rifle Corps (KRRC), 10th and 11th battalions Rifle Brigade (Rifles)) and 60th (Note: 6th Oxfordshire and Buckinghamshire Light Infantry (Ox & Bucks), 6th battalion King's Own Shropshire Light Infantry (KSOLI), 12th battalion KRRC and 12th battalion Rifles) Brigades were concentrated at Blackdown with the Division Headquarters and other division troops. The 61st Brigade (Note: 7th battalion Somerset Light Infantry, 7th battalion Duke of Cornwall's Light Infantry (DCLI), 7th battalion King's Own Yorkshire Light Infantry (KOYLI) and (initially) the 11th battalion Durham Light Infantry (DLI)) was concentrated at Aldershot, where the medical component also trained, the Artillery was formed near Deepcut, the engineers were trained at Chatham. Clothing, in the form of emergency Kitchener Blue uniforms did not arrive until November, together with a few old rifles for drill practice, the artillery had only two 90 mm guns and two 15-pounders per brigade. The supply situation had improved by February 1915 when the Division moved to Whitley, by which time the 11th DLI, which had a large number of miners in it had become the Division pioneer battalion, trading places in the 61st Brigade with the 12th King's Regiment, the original divisional troops battalion. In April the Division marched to the Salisbury Plain Training Area to complete its training and were joined by the field ambulances after their training in June. the Division was inspected by the King at the end of that month, and embarked for France in the later part of July.

==== Arrival in France ====
Leaving Amesbury on 20 July, by 26 July the division was concentrated in the Lumbres area 22 miles (35 km) east of Boulogne-sur-Mer. By 30 July the Division was part of III Corps of the First Army, and was billeted in the area between Hazebrouck and Armentières. Training now began in trench warfare, with officers and N.C.O.s being posted to the 8th and 27th Divisions, and bombing (grenades), machine gun and gas mask training for the other troops. The units of the division were rotated though the 8th and 27th Divisions in turn to experience trench warfare first hand between 2 and 17 August. The engineers and pioneers were employed at various tasks behind the lines.

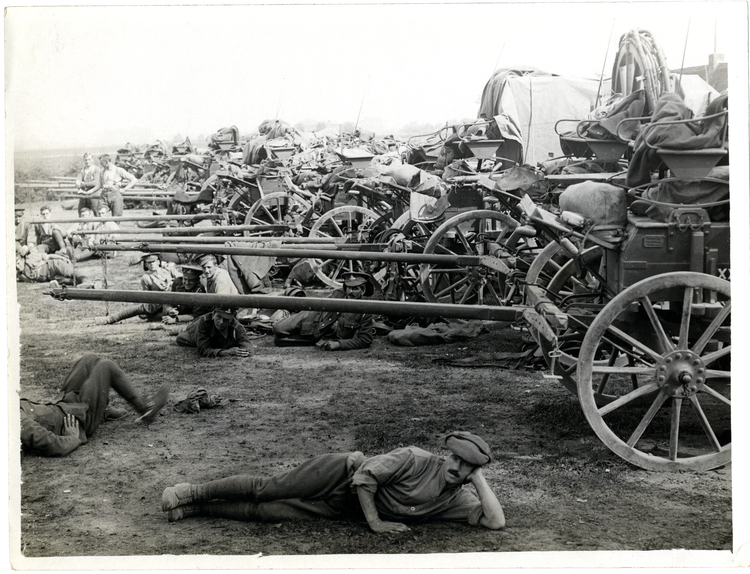
Ammunition column carts of the 20th (Light) Division, Estaires, August 1915

At the end of August the division went into the front line in front of Levantie, 5 miles (8.0 km) south west of Armentiers, 59th and 60th Brigades in the line and the 61st in reserve. In this area the high water table meant that breastworks were required for defence. During September mining and counter mining were carried out and snipers were trained in response to losses from German snipers. The 61st Brigade moved into the line on 5 September, relieving a brigade of the 8th Division. In the early hours of 13 September a mine was exploded by the Germans under a small salient held by 7th S.L.I. The crater was occupied by others from the battalion in spite of German shelling and mortaring, and 12 of the soldiers buried by the explosion were rescued alive. The first gallantry awards earned by men of the division were awarded for this action. These amounted to a Military Cross and a Distinguished Service Medal.

==== Loos ====
As part of a subsidiary action north of Loos, the 20th Division with the flanking Divisions (the Meerut Division to the south and the 8th to the north) were to launch a diversionary attack on the German lines, holding any lines gained. After four days of bombardment, with changes in the tempo of the shelling falsely indicating an imminent attack, and other demonstrations from the front line the attack was made on the morning of 25 September. Troops from the Indian Bareilly Brigade, and two battalions from the 60th Brigade (6th K.S.L.I. and 12th R.B.) managed to enter the German lines, but an attempt to drive a sap back towards the British lines was met with heavy enfilade fire and was halted. Unable to be supported the British were forced to retire around midday. The other two brigades made no advance that day but were still shelled in their trenches. Lieutenant George Allen Maling, an R.A.M.C. officer of the field ambulance attached to the 60th Brigade, received the Victoria Cross for treating men in the open under heavy shell fire all through the day. The 60th Brigade had suffered 561 casualties in total, and next day the pioneers (11th D.L.I.) were attached to the Brigade as reinforcing infantry until 10 November, and the 68th Brigade from the 23rd Division was attached as division reserve.

The three brigades remained in the line, engaged in patrolling, mining, mortaring, sniping and demonstrating in order to prevent the Germans relieving parts of their line. The Division's mounted troops rotated through the trenches, and the cyclist company troops provided working parties. On 10 November the Indian Corps to the Division's right was relieved and replaced with XI Corps, this allowed the Division to shorten its line to two Brigades, the pioneers and the 68th Brigade returned to their normal roles. For the rest of the year the Division's artillery saw the most use, however a trench raid by parties from 10th R.B. and 11th K.R.R.C. was mounted on the night of 12–13 December. The 11th K.R.R.C. entered the German trenches, inflicting casualties, the 10th R.B. party had further to travel over no-mans land and faced an alerted enemy and were forced to withdraw.

=== 1916 ===
A gas attack, planned for the previous December, was finally launched with the arrival of favourable winds, as the Division began to leave the Levantie sector on 9 January 1916. Less than half of the cylinders intended were still in place and trench raids planned for that night were cancelled. The final units of the division arrived in the reserve area on 13 January. After one weeks rest and training the Division was ordered to the Ypres Salient.

==== Ypres ====
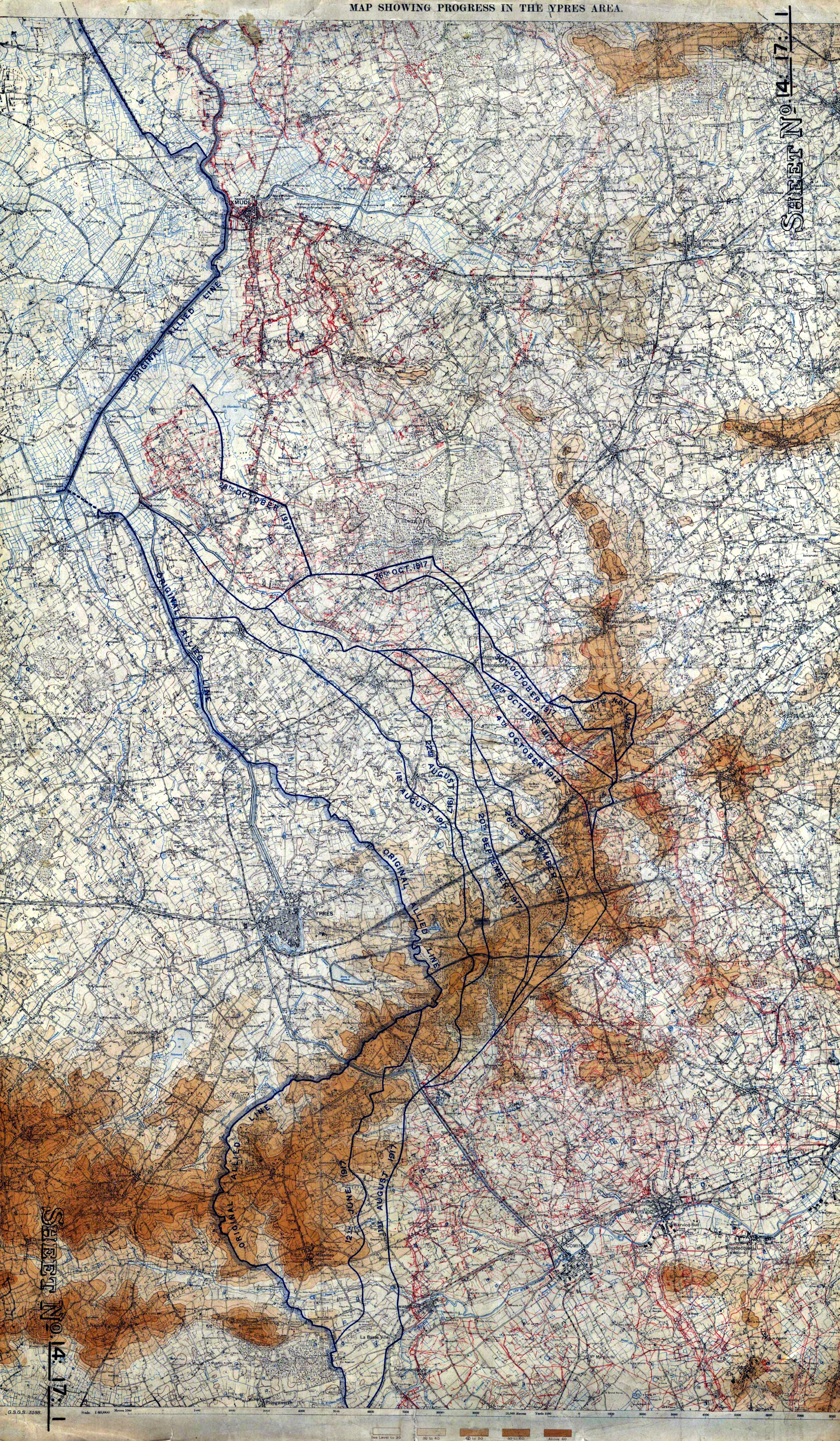
Map showing topography and locations in the Ypres district, detailing British–French advances at Ypres, 1917

Arriving on 22 January in VI Corps reserve area, officers and N.C.O.s were sent to 14th Division, which the Division was to relieve, to become acquainted with the area. On 4 February VI Corps handed over to the newly formed XIV Corps (20th Division and the Guards Division). The Division was in the northern section of the salient, 2.5 miles (4.0 km) north of Ypres with its left on the canal. The area had been rendered a quagmire by shelling and the trench system was fragmented, shallow and poorly maintained, these remnants being separated by gaps of up to 80 yards (73 m) of mud. On the night of 11–12 February during the first placement of 60th Brigade into the line, the Germans attempted to interrupt the relief, but were thrown back after temporarily capturing one of the trench fragments. They were praised by Army and Corps commanders for their successful actions "...in novel conditions which might have placed them at a disadvantage," and by their own division and brigade commanders. Shortly after this isolated points were abandoned, one of which was 20 yards (18 m) from the German line and connected to it by a sap. The engineers and pioneers began the task of improving the trench system, the size of the task indicated by the fact that for a time 4 long tons (4.1 t) of material per night were being moved from divisional workshops to the 96th Field Company R.E., attached to the 60th Brigade. The difference in conditions in the salient can be seen in the casualty figures for the first month, of around 1,000 men killed, wounded or missing, equal to those of the whole five months while in the Laventie sector.

In early March the Division was strengthened by the arrival of three companies of machine gunners, one attached to each brigade.
The Division was relieved by the 6th Division on 15 April, and went into GHQ and Corps reserve around Poperinghe, with the men of each brigade spending around a week on leave in Calais. During a month of rest and retraining, the artillery was reorganised and the mounted troops and cyclist company left the Division.
On 18 May the Division returned to the salient, relieving the Guards Division to the right of its previous position between Wieltje and Hooge, with the 6th Division on its left and the Canadian Corps on its right.

===== Battle of Mont Sorrel =====
On 2 June the Germans launched an attack on the Canadians to the right of the Division. The right of the 60th Brigade received some of the German artillery barrage and two artillery pieces, placed near the Canadian front line to give enfilade fire along the Division's front, were lost with most of the crews. Units travelling up to the line were also shelled, including two companies of 12 K.R.R.C., sent to reinforce the Canadian left. The 60th Brigade was targeted by German artillery on 6 June, however it was able to fire on German infantry moving up to attack the Canadians at Hooge, an infantry attack on the brigade later that day was repulsed, but a mine was exploded under the trenches of 12 R.B. at Gulley Farm killing 11 men. Throughout the day the Division supported the Canadians with Trench mortar fire and the engineers assisted with the maintenance of communications. When the Canadians counter-attacked in the early hours of 13 June the Division launched gas, smoke and artillery attacks on the German lines, followed by patrols and trench raids which met with varied success.

The remainder of the Division's time at Ypres was spent patrolling and in trench raids. On 13 July 60th Brigade was placed under orders of II ANZAC Corps and transferred to the Armentieres sector, and supported an unsuccessful attack by the 61st (2nd South Midland) Division and the 5th Australian Division on 19 June. The remainder of the Division was relieved on 14 July. On 19 July the Division began to move back into the Line between Messines and Wytschaete, relieving the 24th Division. The Division Commander had been in command of the area for little more than an hour when verbal orders were received for a move south. The 60th Brigade rejoined the Division on 23 July, on 25–26 July the Division moved south leaving its artillery in the Ypres area.

==== The Somme ====
By 29 July the division was in the line on the north of the Somme battlefield, between Beaumont-Hamel and Hebuterne, having relieved the 38th (Welsh) Division except for its artillery which stayed to support the 20th. To the right of the division was the 25th Division, and to the left, the 56th (1st London) Division. The trenches in this area had been heavily shelled by the Germans in the first days of the battle, and the front could only be held with advance parties. The pioneers and engineers of the division dug new firing trenches and had to repair the communications trenches up to 500 yards (460 m) behind the front line. The division signal company was also employed repairing and replacing the buried telephone cables of the area, all the while under sporadic artillery and trench mortar fire. The 38th Division artillery was relieved by the Guards Division artillery on 7 August, and on 16 August the division was relieved by the Guards Division.

===== Battle of Guillemont =====
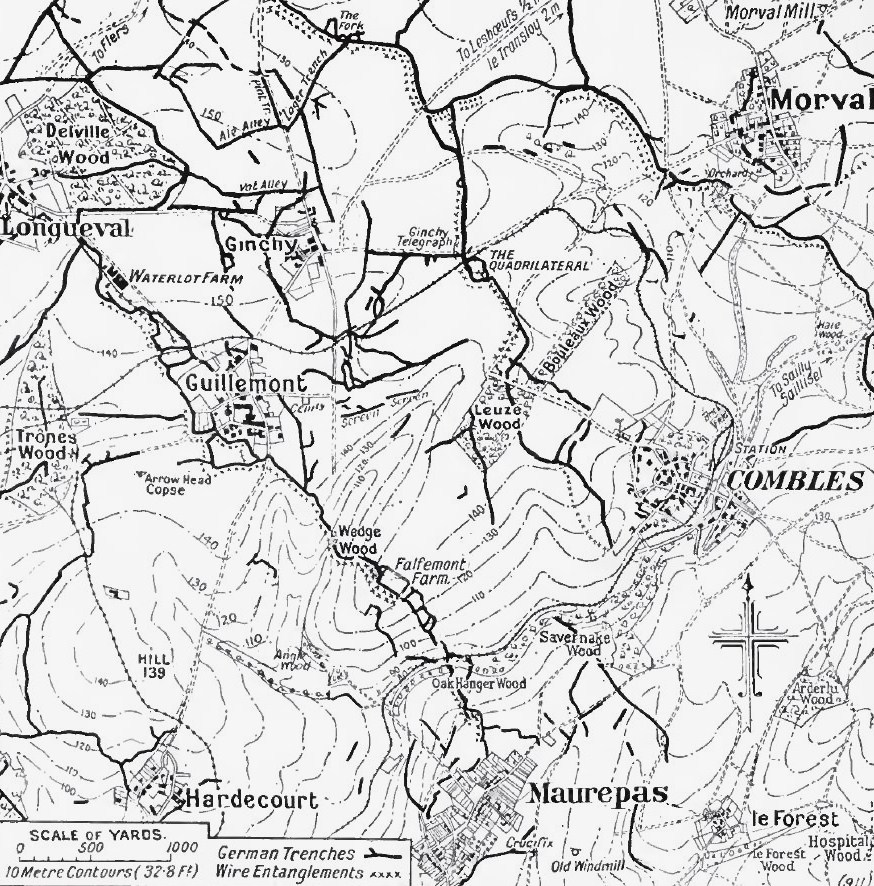
German defensive lines, vicinity of Delville Wood, Guillemont, Maurepas, Morval (July–September 1916)

The division returned to the line on 22 August, relieving the 24th Division north of the Guillemont-Montauban road and south of Delville Wood. The 59th and 61st brigades were in the line with one battalion each in the firing trenches, the division was supported by the artillery of the 6th Division. Preparations for an assault on 24 August were begun, repairing and digging new trenches for the assault, but this was interrupted by German artillery on the evening of 23 August followed by an infantry advance on the 11th K.R.R.C., this was broken up by rifle and machine-gun fire, but the trenches were damaged again and the battalion suffered around 150 casualties from the bombardment. The attack was postponed by the Corps command, and the division side stepped to the south of the Guillemont-Montauban road, west of the village on 25–26 August. Preparations for the new attack were hampered by a rain and heavy shelling, including the use of gas shells by the Germans.

Supply of the front line became difficult and at one point (29 August) 37 of the division's vehicles were stuck in the mud of the Carnoy-Montauban road. On the night of 28/29 August all available men of all three brigades were working in the mud of the forward area still covered in the bodies of the dead from previous assaults. Coupled with German probing attacks the troops were becoming exhausted and some time out of the trenches was agreed for the 59th and 60th brigades which were scheduled to make the attack, which had been put back to 3 September. The 59th brigade had suffered 600 casualties in the line in nine days and the 60th was so weakened that (with the exception of 6th Ox and Bucks L.I.) it was withdrawn into Corps reserve and replaced in the division with 47th brigade from the 16th (Irish) Division. The 6th Ox and Bucks L.I, still only 550 rifles strong, was attached to the 59th brigade.

The 59th brigade returned to the trenches prepared by the pioneers and engineers during the night of 2–3 September, they were to be the right of the divisions advance with the 47th brigade on the left, each brigade supported by a battalion from the 61st brigade and a company of the division's engineers and one of pioneers, the remainder of 61st brigade and the three battalions of 60th brigade (only around 1000 men) were in reserve. The 5th Division was to advance on the division's right, and the 7th Division on its left. Additional artillery support was provided by the artillery from the 8th and 24th divisions and the Corps heavy artillery.

The artillery bombardment began at 06:00 hours at selected targets, moving around the battle field and including gas at around 08:30 hours. The 5th division's advance began at 09:00 hours, 20th division advanced at noon behind stationary and rolling barrages, with the advance led by the 10th and 11th R.B. and the 6th Connaught Rangers and 7th Leinsters. The first objective was occupied by 12:30, a sunken road some 350 yards (320 m) from the start line and parts of the western edge of the village were held by the 6th Ox and Bucks L.I. and 10th K.R.R.C., parts of the northern edge of the village were held by the 6th Connaught Rangers and 7th Leinsters. The reserve brigade began to move forward.

The attack on the second objective, a road running roughly north-south through the eastern part of the village, then north-east towards Ginchy, on average about 100 yards (91 m) further on, began at 12:50, with the 10th and 11th R.B. in the lead supported by the two K.R.R.C. battalions and the 6th Ox & Bucks, and on the 47th brigade front the 8th Munster Fusiliers with the Leinsters and Connaughts in support. The road was reached by 13:30 with the supporting infantry mopping up in the village and an orchard to the south. The assault on the third objective, a road between Ginchy to the north and "Wedge wood" to the south, about 400 yards (370 m) east of the village was begun at 14:00 hours, while the 59th brigade encountered only small parties of Germans, the 6th Royal Irish and the Munsters had to rush the last 70 yards (64 m) to the road under fire from positions on it.

The final objective was a line between the corner of Leuze wood to the south (800 yards (730 m) further forward) and the railway line to the north (300 yards (270 m) from the third line). However the 5th division had not gained ground and the right flank of 59th brigade was open, Brigadier-General Shute then lengthened the line 300 yards (270 m) to the right with the 6th Ox and Bucks and used the 7th D.C.L.I. to form a flank facing south east. On the left, 7th division were reported in the village of Ginchy. The engineers and pioneers continued to consolidate the village and troops from the reserve moved forward through it. An advance to the fourth line was ordered at 15:50 hours. However, by 17:00 hours the situation had changed, 7th division were driven out of Ginchy and the 5th division had not managed to advance to Leuze wood. A bombardment by Corps artillery helped stabilise the line in front of the 20th division that night. Patrols were made up to the forth line and on the flanks, one of these from the 12th King's sent towards Ginchy became isolated during repeated German attacks on that flank between 17:30 and 20:30 hours. That night the 83rd and 96th engineer companies, the 7th D.C.L.I. and two companies of pioneers continued to consolidate Guillemont, while the 84th engineer company and the remaining pioneers strengthened the line on the road. Orders for the next day (4 September) were to send out patrols under artillery support and establish the division on the fourth objective. Due to their losses the Royal Irish and the Munsters were ordered to be replaced by 60th brigade, 12th K.R.R.C. and 12 R.B. and the 7th K.O.Y.L.I.. The 59th brigade was also becoming exhausted and two companies of the 11th D.L.I. were sent to relieve the most tired units.

The attack began at 19:30 hours, and with the 5th division advancing on the right, reached the final objective. The 47th and 59th brigades were relieved by the 16th (Irish) Division during the night and morning of 4–5 September, including the isolated patrol from the 12 King's, led by Sgt David Jones, this reduced platoon had held out for two days, repulsing three attacks on the morning of 5 September. For this Sgt Jones was awarded the Victoria Cross. The remainder of the division left the front line on 7 September. During the battle the division had lost 1973 officers and men killed, wounded or missing.

===== Morval and Lesbœufs =====
The division artillery had returned from the Ypres salient to the Somme on 13 September and was posted to XIV Corps but not under command of the 20th division. While at Ypres 90th artillery brigade had been broken up a distributed amongst the other to increase each battery from four to six 18-pounders or 4.5" howitzers. The 91st artillery brigade was in action on 15 September supporting the 56th (London) Division. The division returned to the front on 15 September as XIV Corps reserve, after a short rest but no reinforcement. The 59th brigade could muster only 900 rifles, the 60th brigade 1100 and the 61st brigade 1200. In the early hours of 16 September the 60th and 61st brigade went into the front line under orders of the Guards Division, the 61st to the right of the Guards line opposite Lesbœufs and the 60th in reserve.

The objective was a trench line around 1,200 yards (1,100 m) west of the villages of Morval and Lesbœufs and was to be taken by 61st brigade on the right and the 3rd Guards brigade on the left. The 31st brigade right flank was open as the 6th division was held up by the 'Quadrilateral' fortification. Due to late orders the 61st brigade was late forming up and was subject to heavy machine-gun and Minenwerfer fire, causing many casualties. Following the rolling barrage 7th D.C.L.I. gained the objective, however only one company of the 7th S.L.I. gained the line. Both flanks of the 7th D.C.L.I. were initially open as the remainder of the 7th S.L.I. had dug in short of the trench line and the guards brigade, which had also received their orders late, had faced strong opposition during their advance. In this isolated position the advance to the second line was called off. Later that morning the right flank of the brigade was secured by the 7th K.O.Y.L.I. and the 12th King's and the 84th Engineer company reinforced the position. All battalions remained in this position overnight, under fire from the Germans, until relieved the next morning.

While the 61st brigade went into Corps reserve the remainder of the division relieved the Guards in the front line during the night of 16–17 September, the 60th brigade on the right, the 59th on the left. The relief was made against German opposition, the 59th brigade moving up under gas attack and the 60th facing German attempts to enter their trenches later that day. On 17 September the 59th brigade were ordered to capture the remaining 800 yards (730 m) of the trench line not taken the previous day. The orders were received only a short time before the attack due to the difficulty in communicating with the front line, which was an old communications trench at right angles to the line of intended advance. One company of the 11th R.B. did not receive any orders, all the runners to this unit being killed or wounded. With no artillery support available the attack failed with some men of the 10th R.B. being killed on reaching the German wire. After consolidating the trenches the division was relieved on 21 September. The division's artillery, still under Corps control supported a number of other divisions in this area, which resulted in the capture of Morval and Lesbœufs on 25 September.

===== Le Transloy =====
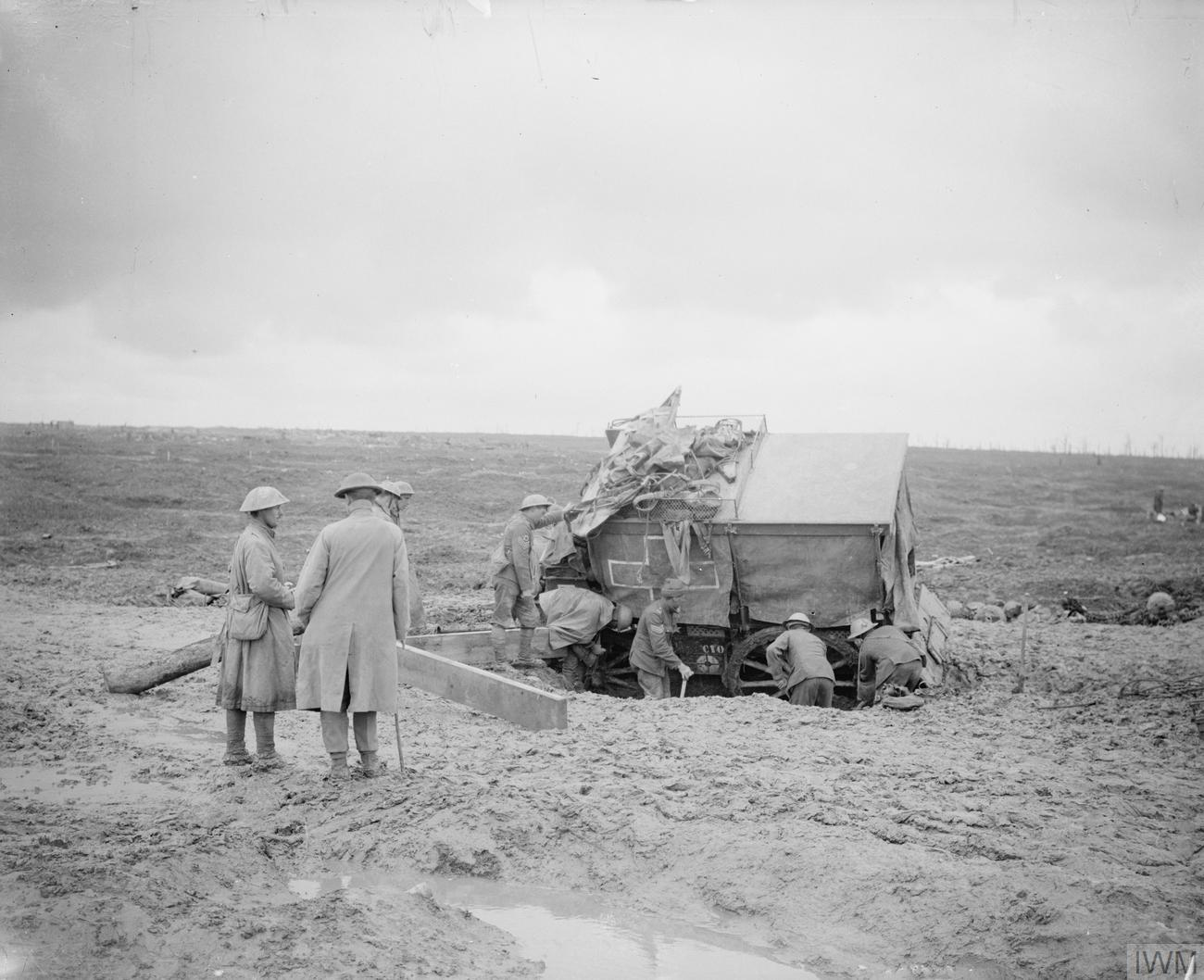
20th Division ambulance (the division sign is in front of the rear wheel), stuck in the mud near Guillemont, October 1916

The division returned to the front on 25 September and eventually relieved the 21st Division on the night of 29–30 September from halfway between Lesbœufs to a point 250 yards (230 m) east of Gueudecourt, facing a low ridge beyond which was Le Transloy. The front line was held by 61st brigade with 60th in support and the 59th brigade in reserve some 5 miles (8.0 km) behind the line, west of Guillemont. For the next advance the division was to be supported by a strong artillery group consisting of the division's own three artillery brigades, those of the Guards division and a brigade from the 6th division. This artillery was crowded together in a valley known as 'Toc 7 Valley' about 800 yards (730 m) north-east of Delville Wood, a position known to the Germans and shelled regularly.

Before the main assault, on 1 October 7 S.L.I. and 7th D.C.L.I. pushed the line forward by 400 yards (370 m) in a series of small posts into dead ground within 200 yards (180 m) of the German line, repelling a counter-attack later that day. That night the engineers and pioneers connected and consolidated these posts. On the night of 3–4 October the 60th brigade joined the 61st in the front line, however due to a break in the weather the assault was put back for two days to 7 October. This allowed the troops who were to make the assault two days rest out of the line, further supplies to be brought up and more front line and communications trenches to be prepared. The strength of the brigades had recovered to a total of just under 6,500 men in total, still only slight over 50% of the nominal strength.

The objective was to establish a line over the crest of the ridge overlooking Le Transloy on the second German trench and was only a small part of an attack of the whole front of Fourth Army. On the left 61st brigade would attack with 6th Ox and Bucks L.I and 12th R.B. with 12th K.R.R.C. in support and 6th K.S.L.I. in reserve and on the right for 60th brigade, 7th K.O.Y.L.I. and 12th King's with 7th S.L.I in support and 7th D.C.L.I. in reserve. On 7 October the preceding artillery bombardment managed to cut most of the German wire except for some on the 60th brigade front. At 13:45 hours the attack began behind the rolling barrage with each battalion advancing in four lines. The uncut wire caused delays and heavy casualties to the 6th Ox and Bucks and 12th R.B. and an open left flank, caused by a heavy German bombardment on 12th (Eastern) Division, caused casualties to the 61st brigade from enfilade fire. In spite of this the first two lines of troops took the first trench, 'Rainbow Trench' and the third and fourth lines formed up beyond it ready for the next stage. At 14:05 hours the next barrage began and the second trench, 'Cloudy Trench', was found to be little more than a line of disturbed earth when it was taken against lighter resistance only ten minutes later. The division, now digging in on its new line, was now in a salient with exposed flanks and a gap of around 350 yards (320 m) between the brigades with the leading battalion lines commanded by a Captain (12th King's) and a lieutenant (7th K.O.L.I.). Companies from the support and reserve battalions were brought forward to fill in the gaps and German counterattacks later that day were beaten off. The engineers and pioneers together with other troops established a communication trench to the front line, and men from the 59th brigade came forward to continue work in the starting lines.

The division was relieved by 6th division on the night of 8–9 October, having lost 1,112 killed, wounded and missing from the brigades and taken 192 German prisoners. It moved to Treux for a period of rest, while there, corps commander praised the men of the division for their part in the Somme battles and added,

I have asked the Army Commander and the Commander-in-Chief not to take away the 20th Division if they can help it, and they have promised to do their best. I would not lose the 20th Division for crowns and crowns.

— Lieutenant General Lord Cavan

The division's artillery remained in the line as part of the Corps artillery group, assisting in later assaults. The remainder of the division would spend two months out of the line resting, retraining and absorbing much needed replacements. The division returned to the line on 9 December, relieving the 29th Division around 1 mile (1.6 km) south-west and south of Le Transloy. The weather was bad and communications between the front line and rear area was slow at first, a relief to the firing trench taking as long as nine hours, with only some improvement achieved by the time the division left the area. After a relatively uneventful time the division was relieved by the 17th (Northern) Division on 25 December. The 93rd artillery brigade was transferred permanently to Army control about this time.

=== 1917 ===
The division returned to the front on 4 January, relieving the Guards 2.5 miles (4.0 km) south of Le Transloy in a line through the village of Sailley-Saillisel. Two brigades, the 60th and 61st were at the front with two battalions each in the fire trench, the Guards division was to the right and the 17th (Northern) to the left. The front line consisted of a series of isolated posts, some only 10 yards (9.1 m) from the Germans. The divisions artillery was once again under command of the division for a while as part of the Corp group, with 29th division's artillery and other units. Until relieved on 30 January by 17th (Northern) division, the 20th held the line repulsing German attacks with the machine gunners and artillery providing covering fire for other formations attacks. On 10 February the division returned to the front, on the northern edge of their previous position and lost one of the more isolated advanced posts which was out of sight from the British line and which the division had been given permission to abandon shortly before its loss. By the beginning of March the British were aware that the Germans intended to withdraw to a more favourable line.

==== The Hindenburg Line ====
The Germans began to retire from the line in front of 20th division on 17 March, after morning patrols had found them still in place. Thereafter the division kept pace with the German rearguard and by 28 March had advanced some 6 miles (9.7 km) from its position in front of Le-Transloy. Here the Germans established a line of resistance along the line of the villages of Fins, Neuville-Bourjonval and Ruyaulcourt. During this time the division had been transferred to XV Corps and had been joined on 24 March by the 217th Machine Gun Company as the divisional machine gunners. The initial advance of the division's artillery (still part of the corps group) had been hampered by the torn-up ground of the battlefield, on one occasion taking up to six hours to move guns 1 mile (1.6 km), and on another losing one gun in a water filled shell hole. In order to improve the roads in the division's rear the 96th engineer company, 11th D.L.I., 10th RB. and 7th K.O.Y.L.I were detached under corps orders to improved road and rail communications, returning to the division at the end of the month.

On 28 March the 61st brigade supported by the 91st artillery brigade, 84th engineer company and a squadron from the XIV Corps cavalry regiment (King Edward's Horse) were ordered to take the villages of Neuville-Bourjonval (7th D.C.L.I.) and Ruyaulcourt (12th King's). Starting from the village of Ytres at 20:15 hours against heavy machine gun fire, Neuville-Bourjonval was entered early on 29 March and was occupied by 02:30 hours with posts established 100 yards (91 m) to its east.

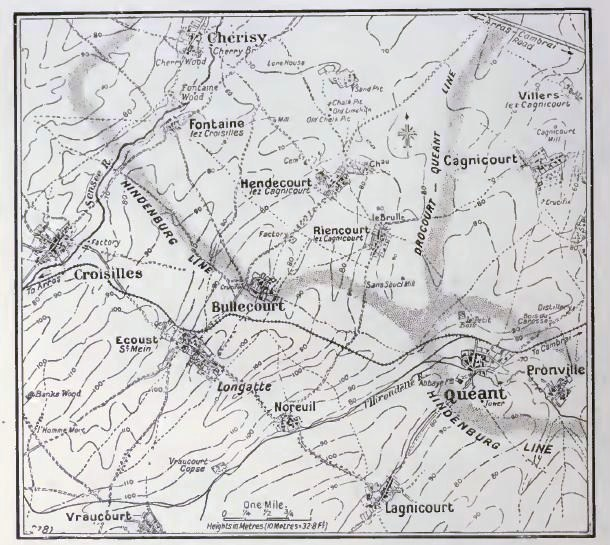
Hindenburg defences, Quéant, 1917

The attack on Ruyaulcourt was defeated by a wire trap not previously known and the battalion entrenched 500 yards (460 m) south west of the village. The next night the village was found empty and occupied by the 7th S.L.I. while the 59th brigade established a line along the northern half of the Neuville-Bourjonval – Fins road. On 4 April the 59th brigade supported by 83rd engineer company and the whole of the division artillery attacked a German line between the village of Metz 1.7 miles (2.7 km) west of Neuville-Bourjonval and the corner of Haverincourt Wood. The 10th and 11th K.R.R.C. suffered heavy casualties, around 25% due to machine gun and rifle fire but occupied the village some two hours after the assault began. German prisoners stated that they had not expected to be attacked until 7 April. Thereafter the line was continually pushed forwards, and before the end of April was in front of the Hindenburg Line from north of Trescault, 9 miles (14 km) from Le-Transloy, north west through Haverincourt Wood to the Canal du Nord. For the next few weeks the division had a relatively quiet time, apart from digging the new front line. On 23 May the division was relieved by the 40th Division and it was transferred to the Fifth Army, IV Corps.

The division was redeployed 7.5 miles (12.1 km) to the north west facing Quéant where IV Corps relieved I Anzac Corps, 48th (South Midland) Division was to the division's right and 58th (2/1st London) Division (of V Corps) to its left. The line here, from ~1,000 yards (910 m) east of Bullecourt (in the original Hindenburg system) to just east of Lagnicourt, was a series of posts, as the trench system had been comprehensively wrecked, and the divisional artillery could only be sited in valleys which ran towards the German lines and were so under observation. Three weeks of active patrolling and trench raids followed with the division suffering heavy bombardment, especially during reliefs. By 22 June the artillery had left the line to refit and on 29 June the rest of the division was relieved by 62nd (2nd West Riding) Division.

==== Third Battle of Ypres ====
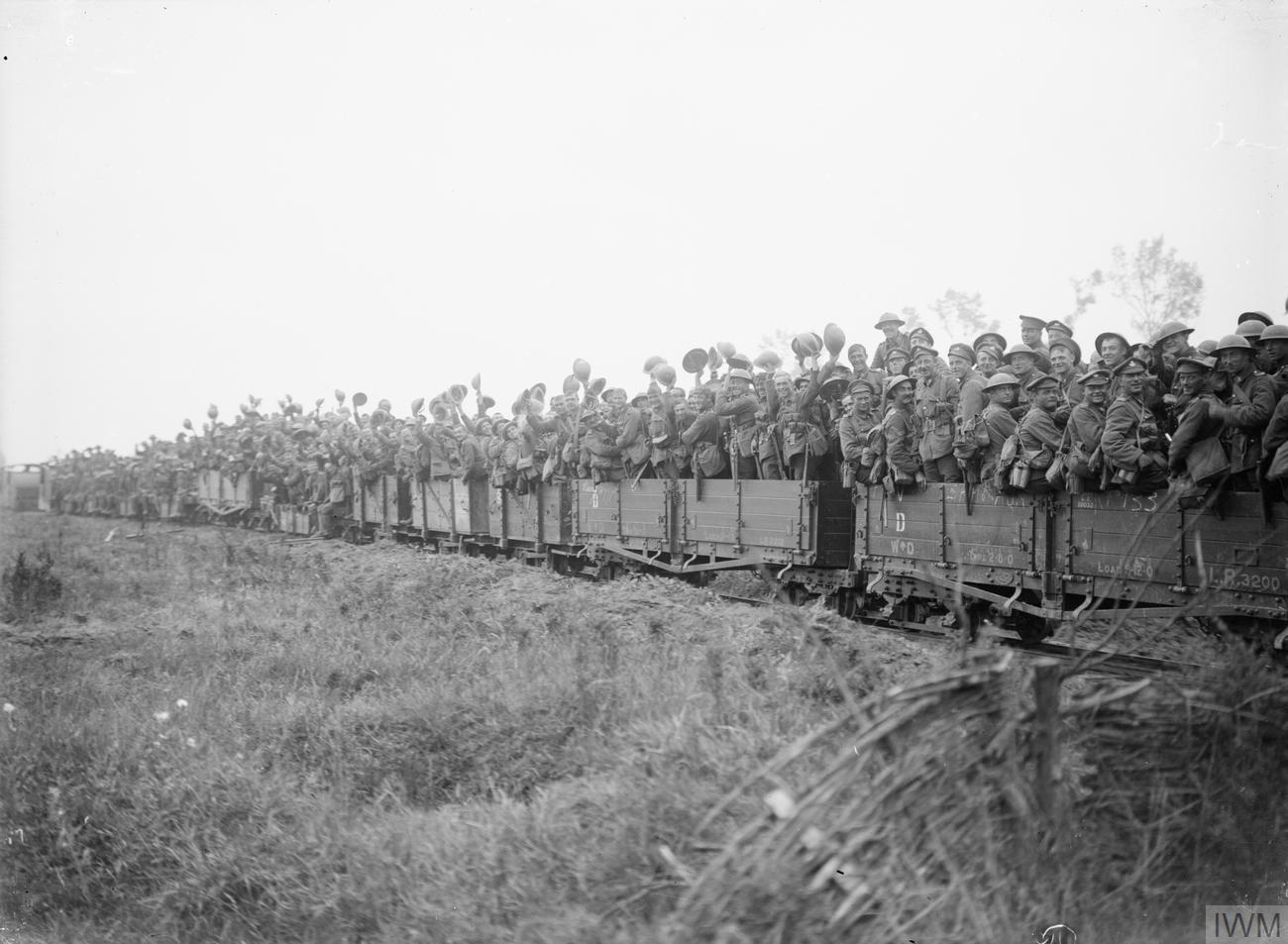
Men of the 11th (Service) Battalion, Durham Light Infantry being taken forward by light railway near Elverdinghe, during the Third Battle of Ypres, 31 July 1917.

The division concentrated south east of Amiens on 1 July for rest and retraining. The artillery marched to the Ypres salient over the first two weeks of July, here the two brigades rejoined the 93rd (Army) artillery brigade in the XIV Corps artillery group and covered the corps front between the Ypres-Pilckem road and the canal in the north of the salient, where 20th division had been in 1916. The gun batteries and ammunition column suffered casualties from German counter battery fire. The rest of the division arrived on 20 July and went into the XIV corps area as a reserve. On 25 July 10th and 11th K.R.R.C. and 10th R.B. were detached to 38th (Welsh) Division as carrying parties and the 59th and 217th machine gun companies were also sent forward.

On 30 and 31 July the 59th Brigade, 83rd engineer company and the 11th D.L.I. went forward to positions west and south of Elverdinghe, some 2 miles (3.2 km) west of the front line and the artillery fired fixed and rolling barrages for the advance of the Guards and 38th divisions during the Battle of Pilckem Ridge. The subsequent advance of the artillery to the Yers canal was made difficult by the rain that fell from the afternoon of 31 July to 3 August. On 6 August the division relieved the 38th (Welsh), with the 61st brigade in the front along 1,000 yards (910 m) of the Steenbeek with its left on the railway line.

===== Battle of Langemarck =====
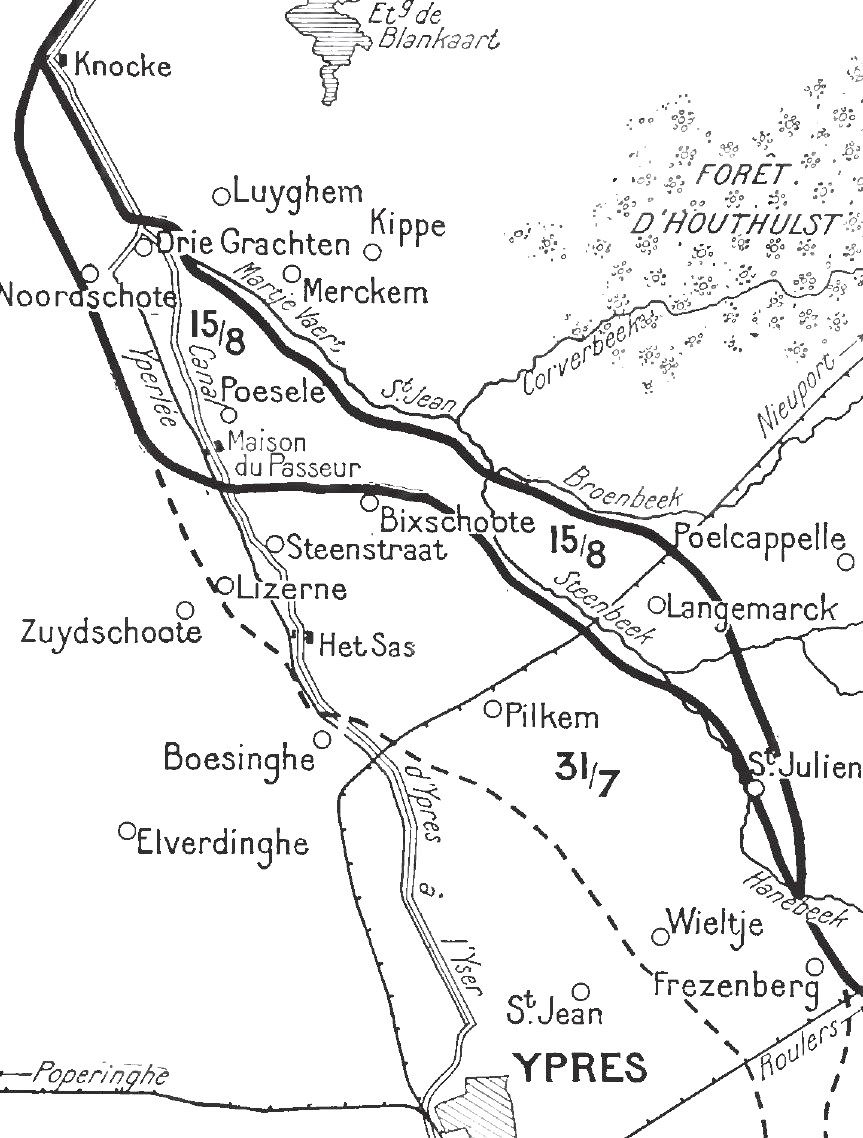
Front line after Battle of Langemarck, 16–18 August 1917

On 7 August the 59th brigade was tasked with establishing a series of post of the eastern bank of the Steenbeek, as the 11th (Northern) Division to the right and the 29th Division to the left had already done. This was complicated on the 20th Division front by the marshy nature of the ground on both sides of the stream and a German strong point at Au Bon Gite, 300 yards (270 m) east of the stream on the Langemarck road. Initial attempts by two companies of the 11th K.R.R.C. made on 8 August failed, as did another with two companies of the 10th K.R.R.C. given artillery support on 11 August, a third attack on 14 August by six companies of 10th and 11th R.B. reached the Au Bon Gite pillboxes, but could not take the largest of them and were forced back by a counterattack 200 yards (180 m) with heavy casualties of over 210 officers and men. A fourth attempt on 15 August was cancelled and the ground gained was deemed sufficient for forming up for the forthcoming attack.

The larger operation, a phase of the Third battle of Ypres, was to begin on 16 August, with 60th and 61st brigades attacking north-east towards, around and past Langemarck, after the previous weeks losses 59th brigade, as division reserve, was reinforced with two battalions, 10th and 15th battalions, the Welch Regiment, from 38th (Welsh) Division. The 83rd and 84th engineer companies placed wooden bridges across the Steenbeek to allow the initial assaulting troops to form up on the east bank, and in spite of having to form up in some places within 80 yards (73 m) of German posts in front of the Au Bon Gite strong point, the build up on the east bank was achieved without the Germans being aware of the movement even while it was conducted through the 'usual' harassing, but undirected, artillery and machine gun fire. The three phase lines were a road through the west of Langmarck, the second a line east of the village and the third on a road junction about 1 mile (1.6 km) from the Steenbeek.

The 60th brigade would attack on the right on a one battalion front, through the village, the 61st, on the left, on a two battalion front along the railway line. The 61st brigade front would widen, and the 60th brigades front veer northward after Langemarck, widening the division's front to 1,400 yards (1,300 m) at the last phase line. In 60th brigade the 6th Ox and Bucks were to take the first two phase lines then the 12th K.R.R.C. and the 6th K.L.S.I. advance to the last, screening the German reserve known to be in Poelkapelle. On the 61st brigade front two companies each of the 7th K.O.Y.L.I. and the 7th S.L.I. were each allotted to the first and second phase lines, 12th King's and 7th D.C.L.I. taking the third. Sections of the brigade machine gun companies and trench mortar batteries would also accompany the assault. For the remaining hard points at Au Bon Gite, a company of the 11th R.B., familiar with the area, and a party of the 83rd engineer company would advance with the Oxfords to reduce and mask them while the rest the advance continued. The 29th Division were to the left and the 11th (Northern) Division on the right

The artillery barrage and infantry advance began at 04:45 hours, with the assault on the Au Bon Gite blockhouse starting at the same time from the 11th R.B. who had crawled up within a few yards of the position. It was soon captured, but only after being able to fire at the 61st brigade advance in enfilade. The most severe hold up was due to the condition of the ground, which was '...nothing more than a swampy crater field as far as the final objective', and particularly bad up to the first objective. The first wave of the 6th Ox and Bucks gained the first line at 05:20 with few losses. On the 61st brigade front the 7th K.O.Y.L.I. were fired on from blockhouses in Langemarck and at Langemarck railway station causing heavy losses to the officers, here Private Wilfred Edwards won the Victoria Cross attacking one of the blockhouses, and the first line on this brigade front was reached at 05:40. The advance to the second line began at 05:45, and the second wave of the 6th Ox and Bucks reach the second line soon after. Behind them the 6th K.S.L.I and 12th K.R.R.C., mopping up in the village, came under fire from another blockhouse. Crossing 250 yards (230 m) of open ground Sergeant Edward Cooper subdued the position capturing 46 prisoners and seven machine guns, winning the second Victoria Cross of the day in the division. These two battalions then formed up on the second line. On the left in 61st brigade, the K.O.Y.L.I. was left with only one officer as a company commander, the others being led by sergeants. The 12th King's and 7th D.C.L.I. which had suffered casualties in the mopping up, now formed up in the second line. The advance to the third line began at 07:20 and by 07:45 the 60th brigade reached the final line after opposition from its right flank and the 61st brigade reached the line at 08:00. The division was in contact with both flanking divisions on the final objective, and had taken around 400 prisoners, including a battalion commander, a section of howizers, a 77mm field gun and around 25 machine guns.

A division stretcher bearer party, some 200 men strong, was created for the battle and tasked with clearing the battlefield of wounded. They worked throughout the day and night, and were regarded as an unqualified success.

The Germans counter-attacked at 16:00 at the junction of the brigades and drove back the 12th K.R.R.C. and 12th King's 200 yards (180 m), with one company of the 12th K.R.R.C. being almost wiped out. The next day an attempt to retake the ground partly succeeded, the mixed force of 12th King's, 7th S.L.I. and a company of 7th D.C.L.I. retaking the line on the right, but the attack of the 12th R.B. was defeated by enfilade fire. That night the division was relieved by the 38th (Welsh) Division, except for the artillery which remained under orders of the Welsh.

====== Eagle Trench ======
After three weeks out of the line the division returned to the front on 5 September north-east of Langemarck. However, having had no reinforcement, it was under strength after the Langemarck battles with an average battalion strength of only 350 rifles. Relieving the 38th (Welsh) Division, an attack on the trench line opposite Poelkapelle was scheduled for 20 September. Preceded by a "hurricane" bombardment, the 59th brigade on the left and the 60th brigade on the right attacked that morning with the left flank reaching its objective, the right flank was held up by fire from strong points and the centre (the inner flanks of both brigades) making no progress due to fire from Eagle Trench, which was later discovered to be well sited between two 8 feet (2.4 m) embankments, and had an excellent field of fire. The attack was repeated that evening, with the artillery using smoke which was only partly successful, the 11th R.B. gaining a foothold in the trench but at a cost of two thirds of its men and 11 out of 16 officers. The 60th brigade gained further ground on the right. A follow-on attack was planned for 22 September with the aid of two tanks, but these became stuck in Langemarck, and the attack was re-planned for the next day without them. A German counterattack on the 60th brigade, 35 minutes before the planned attack was beaten off, and the attack began at 07:00. With trench mortars bombarding the trench, and both brigades working their way to the centre of the trench from the ends they held using bombing parties (grenade throwers), the 12th K.R.R.C. from the south, 10th R.B. from the north and frontally from the west. A total of 158 prisoners were taken and a number of machine guns captured. The attack earned praise from the Army Commander, General Sir Hubert Gough. Until the division was relieved at the end of the month the pioneers and engineers laboured to establish and strengthen communications to the front line through Langemarck.

The artillery remained in the salient and assisted in attacks that captured Poelcapelle and conducted a difficult relocation across the muddy ground. By the time the artillery was relieved on 18 October they had been in action for three months without relief.

==== Cambrai ====
Battle of Cambrial 1917

On 1 October the division (less the artillery) entrained for Bapaume, and by 10 October had relieved the 40th Division with all three brigades in the line from Villers Plouich to Villers Guislains about 1.5 miles (2.4 km) north to south-east of Gouzeaucourt. The 11th D.L.I. (pioneers) was ordered to send 200 men to strengthen the infantry after the Ypres battles, and received lower fitness men in return. Now part of III Corps of the Third Army, the division had a quiet time in the line and was rejoined by its artillery on 25 October. On 29 October the division line was shortened when the 55th (West Lancashire) Division took over the southern third of the line around Villers Guislains. Brigade commanders and staffs were informed of the plan of attack early in November, other brigade officers only a week before the attack.

During their time in the line, those battalions rotated out of the line were trained in infantry-tank cooperation, the artillery was moved to new positions in the open closer to the line during the nights of 16–19 November. In the weeks preceding the attack, the Division Signals Company was detailed to provide the telephone and signal lines of three attacking divisions, laying 137 miles (220 km) of armoured cable. On 19 November the 60th and 61st brigade entered the new division line from Villers Plouich, south-east to a point 1,000 yards (910 m) north west of Gonnelieu facing 'Welsh Ridge', with the outposts of the old line still manned by the 20th division. The 59th Brigade was in reserve at Gouzeaucourt. In spite of the noise the tanks made moving up to the line the Germans did not respond.

At midnight a continuous roar in the distance informed us that the tanks were moving up to their positions. Everyone was in a dither of excitement. The noise of their approach got louder and louder; minute by minute our anxiety increased, as we could not think it possible that the enemy could help hearing the outrageous noise they were making. As they approached their positions in the dark the guides in front were shouting directions at the top of their voices. We were expecting every minute the German batteries to open up along the whole front line with all the guns they could bring to bear. The tank close to me made the most shattering noise. It seemed to have an open exhaust, and the captain, or whoever was in charge, seemed to have no realisation of the close proximity to the enemy. However, he got the great hulk into his allotted position, and at last stopped his engine, and still nothing happened.

— Captain G Dugdale, HQ 60th brigade,

The plan called for the 60th brigade, supported by 24 tanks of 'A' battalion and 61st brigade, supported by 36 tanks of 'I' battalion, to advance behind a standing barrage launched at the same time as the infantry advance. This advance was to be made between the line of the Villers Plouich – Marcoing railway and a line 2,500 yards (2,300 m) to southeast, in a north-easterly direction astride Welsh Ridge and the valley to the south east of it. The 60th Brigade (on the left) with the 12th K.R.R.C. (left) and 6th Ox and Bucks L.I. (right) in the lead, and 61st Brigade (on the right), with the 7th D.C.L.I. (left) and 7th S.L.I. (right) in the lead, were to advance to a line some 2,000 yards (1,800 m) from the start line. The second objective line with the remaining battalions in the advance was around another 2,000 yards (1,800 m) ahead, on a line containing the whole of Welsh Ridge, whereupon the 59th Brigade and the 29th Division would pass through the 20th Division to a line north of Marcoing and Masnières over the Canal du Nord. The 12th Division was to the right and the 6th Division to the left.

The first wave of tanks advanced at 06:10 hrs on the morning of 20 November with the artillery barrage, provided by six artillery brigades, including the division's 91st artillery brigade, beginning at 06:20, opposition was comparatively light, with only the 12th King's and 12th K.R.R.C. encountering delaying opposition, Rifleman A E Shepherd (12th K.R.R.C.) winning the V.C. at one of the strongpoints encountered. Large numbers of Germans, overwhelmed by the tanks, surrendered or ran away.

They all had their hands up in the air and were running around as fast as they could. It was one of the funniest things I have ever seen, these poor devils running along, their heads bobbing up and down and their eyes starting out of their heads, running for dear life and not knowing where to go or what to do. We sent out two men with fixed bayonets who brought the to the C.O.. When I saw them closer, I felt very sorry for them, but they seemed pleased that we had not shot them as they expected.

— Second Lieutenant G McMurtrie 7th S.L.I.,

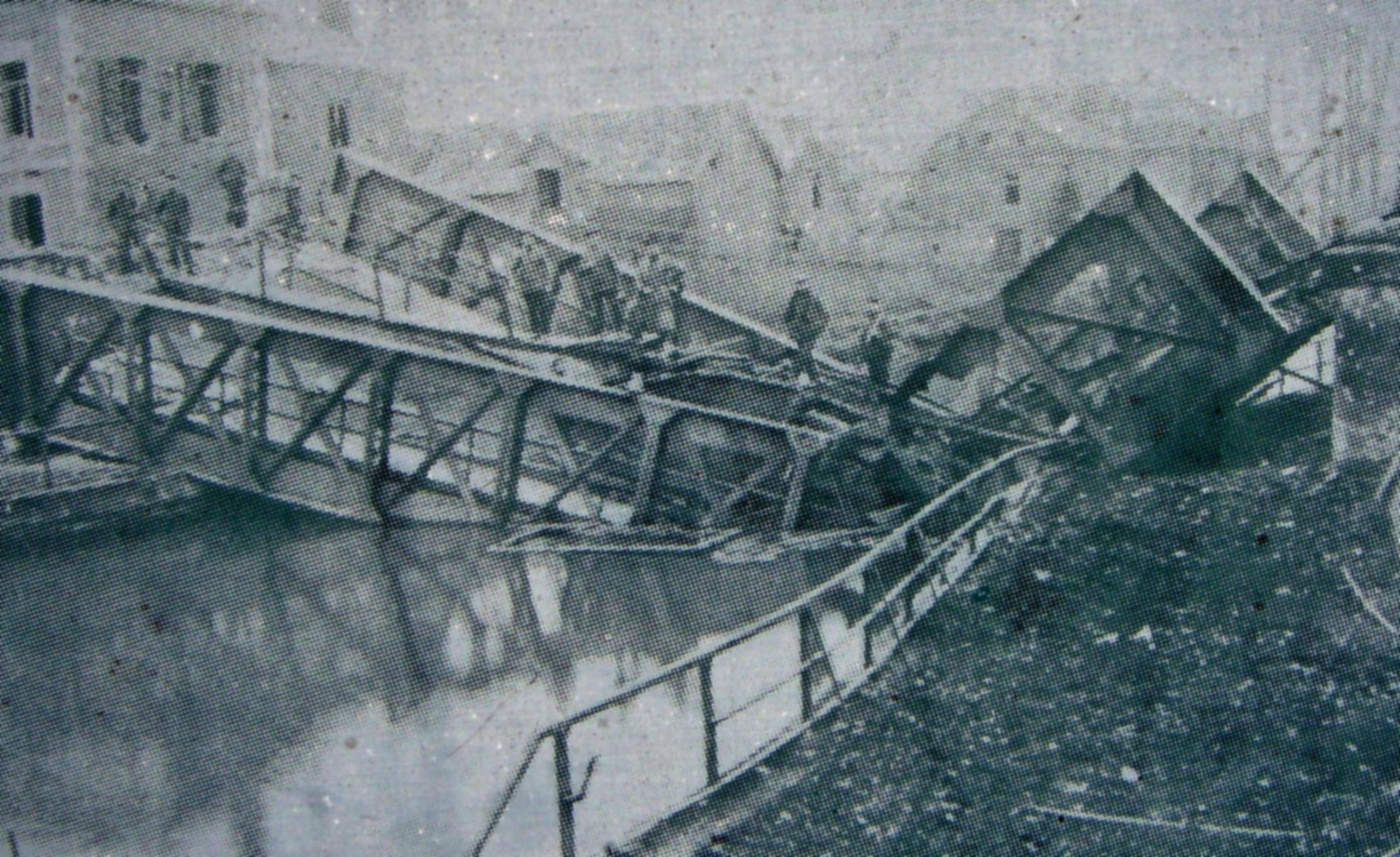
The broken bridge at Masnières

The first line was occupied by 09:25. The advance to the second line was more vigorously contested by the Germans in The Hindenburg Line support trenches, with the 7th K.O.Y.L.I. and 12th R.B. suffering heavy casualties reducing strong points on their respective brigade fronts. However the final objectives were reached by 11:00 hrs. The 59th Brigade led by the 10th and 11th R.B. and a number of troops of the 1/1st Northumberland Yeomanry, having left the start line at 09:10 hrs, passed along the valley south east of Welsh Ridge, and passed through the lines established by the 60th and 61st Brigades. The 10th R.B advancing towards the canal between Marcoing and Les Rues Vertes, and the 10th R.B. towards a line running south of Les Rues Vertes. Outflanking a strong point 800 yards (730 m) south of Marcoing, a company of the 11th R.B. forced a bridgehead across the canal and men of the 29th Division began to cross, C company occupied the village of Les Rues Vertes up to the canal after some street fighting. In Les Rues Vertes, facing Masnières across the main bridge, the 11th R.B were held up by firing from the opposite bank. After the arrival of three tanks, the first of which broke down, the others succeeded in silencing the fire using their 6-pounder guns, Intending to transport a bombing party of the 11th R.B. across the canal, the tank (Flying Fox) collapsed the bridge.

The 91st artillery brigade had moved off from its positions at 10:30 that morning, and despite broken down tanks on the road it was using, was in action that afternoon some 2,500 yards (2,300 m) in front of the old front line. By nightfall the 59th Brigade were established along approximately 2,000 yards (1,800 m) of the line of the canal from Les Rues Vertes east, with one company of the 10th R.B. in the village of Les Rues des Vignes just west of the canal. The K.R.R.C. battalions were stationed in a line south of Les Rue Vertes, and the 60th and 61st brigades were consolidating their positions on the north-eastern end of Welsh Ridge. A night attack by the 11th R.B. to take the canal crossings at Crèvecœur was repulsed. During the day the division had taken over 760 prisoners.

The next day a planned attack by the 59th Brigade, with the 29th Division on its left, and the assistance of 12 tanks, on the canal line gained a little ground around the village of Les Rues Vignes, but caused the 11th K.R.R.C. many casualties after the 29th Division's attack was cancelled and the tanks ran out of petrol. Over the next few days as the struggle for Bourlon Wood was taking place the division consolidated its line which ran from the 12th Division's left flank at Lateau Wood, approximately 3,750 yards (3,430 m) south of les Rues Vert on the canal and 4,250 yards (3,890 m) east of the start line on Welsh Ridge, north-east along the top of a spur for 3,750 yards (3,430 m) then north for 500 yards (460 m) to the canal. In front of this was an outpost line. The 7th S.L.I. was attached to the 88th Brigade of 29th Division between 21 and 24 November and cleared snipers from Masnières. By 30 November the line was held by the 59th Brigade on the right (10th and 11th K.R.R.C. in front), just returned from seven days in reserve, and the 61st Brigade on the left (12th King's and 7th S.L.I. in the front). The reserve battalions were in the valley south east of Welsh Ridge. None of the battalions had more than 400 men and some had less than 300. The division's artillery brigades were at the head of the valley south west of Welsh Ridge approximately 2,000 yards (1,800 m) north of Gonnelieu.

===== German counter-attack =====
Battle of Cambrial 1917 counter attack

The relief of the 60th brigade headquarters had not been completed when the Germans began their counter-attack. After attacking the 12th and 55th Divisions on the right (south) flank at 07:00 hrs, the division was shelled with smoke, mustard gas and high explosive half an hour later. Aided by a thick mist in the valleys and by air support elsewhere, the Germans attacked the 20th Division's front and overwhelmed the outposts, some of which were in any case out of sight of the main line due to the convex slope of the spur north west of the canal. As the attack reached the main line the Germans also appeared on the division's right rear flank, having passed through the 12th Division's lines. With communications cut the reserve battalions had no sooner heard of the attack than they were subject to it, the headquarters and two companies of the 10th R.B. being overrun in this manner. The divisional and brigade machine gun companies also lost many of their guns and men, only a few men of the 217th MG company, north of Lateau Wood, escaping from the assault. The 83rd and 84th engineer companies were also swept up in the fighting, with the commanding officer of the 84th company assuming command of the 61st Brigade when its senior officers were killed. Two companies of the pioneers (11th D.L.I.) were in action at the northern end of Welsh Ridge the other two behind Gouzeaucourt. The remains of the two brigades fell back onto the slopes of Welsh Ridge. The division's artillery was also directly attacked, after the infantry had retreated through the 92nd Brigade's position, the artillery was firing at Point-blank range before being overrun. Later in the day the 11th R.B., accompanied by some of the artillerymen retook the position and were able to remove the breeches of the guns, before pulling back.

By the evening the division's line ran from Gouzeaucourt to Gonnelieu then along the east and north east slopes of Welsh Ridge. To reinforce the division the 2/6th Battalion Sherwood Foresters and 1st Battalion The Buffs from the 6th Division were sent to the 59th and 60th brigades respectively. That night, the 91st artillery brigade was withdrawn from its forward position some 3,000 yards (2,700 m) to Beaucamps.

The next day (1 December) the Germans directed their attacks on the 59th and 60th brigades in the middle and southern part of the line, at one point the three forward companies of the 12th R.B. had only one uninjured officer among them, and the 12th K.R.R.C. also suffered heavily. The next day, 60th Brigade was relieved by 183rd Brigade of the 61st (2nd South Midland) Division, and it repulsed three attacks, with the Rifle Brigade battalions of 59th Brigade also suffering losses during the fighting. On the night of 2–3 December the 59th and 61st brigades were relieved by the rest of the 61st Division, and the division HQ was set up in Sorel 6,300 yards (5,800 m) south west of Gouzeaucourt. The 91st Artillery Brigade remained in action on the Cambrai front for a further two weeks as the British withdrew to the defensible Flesquieres line.

After a few days in Corps reserve, the division was moved north joining the Fourth Army and by 12 December was concentrated about 22 miles (35 km) south west of Ypres. The artillery rejoined the division on 24 December.

=== 1918 ===
On 7 January the division relieved the 30th Division in the IX Corps area, astride the Menin Road, just north west of Gheluvelt. The 60th Brigade was on the left, the 61st on the right, with the New Zealand Division to the left and the 37th Division to the right. The division's time here was relativity quiet, aside from the usual patrolling in 'no-man's land' and an artillery and trench mortar demonstration for a trench raid by the 37th Division o the night of 9–10 January. A reprisal trench raid early on 10 January was beaten back by the 6th K.S.L.I.. The main problems were caused by the weather, which was either freezing, or wet, which made the regular relief of the front line, every 48 or 24 hours difficult.

At the end of January the division was transferred to XXII Corps, which had taken over the sector. In early February the division was reorganised into a three battalion per brigade structure, caused by manpower shortages, some political in origin. The 10th K.R.R.C. and 10th R.B. were disbanded, with the opportunity taken to reinforce the other battalions of those regiments in the division. The 6th Ox & Bucks was also disbanded and the 7th K.O.Y.L.I. became the 14th Entrenching Battalion. Replacing the two battalions lost from the 59th Brigade was the 2nd Battalion Cameronians (Scottish Rifles), at full strength of over 1000 rifles transferring from the 8th Division. The division's trench mortar batteries were reduced, with the heavy battery, V/20, transferring to XXII Corps and the medium Z/20 battery being broken up and distributed to the X/20 and Y/20 batteries. The artillery brigades were strengthened after the losses of the Cambrai battles. The division was relieved by 37th Division on 19 February, and was moved south to the Somme.

==== Spring Offensive ====
It was known that the Germans would mount an offensive with troops freed from the Eastern Front. On 23 February the division arrived in the Fifth Army as G.H.Q. reserve, attached to XVIII Corps and was billeted in the area of Ham about 16 miles (26 km) south west of the front line at Saint-Quentin. Here the division prepared defences behind the anticipated battle zone. On 10 March the division was placed on 12 hours notice to move, on 20 March this was reduced to one hour, and 05:00 hrs on 21 March it was ordered to man its battle stations.

===== The Somme 1918 =====
Map of German Somme offensive 1918

The plan was for the division to support the font line between the river Somme and its tributary the Omignon some 8.5 miles (13.7 km) east of Saint Quentin, with the artillery being sent to support the 36th (Welsh) (92nd brigade), and 30th Divisions (91st brigade), north and south of the division respectively. The division was ordered to move at 13:00 hrs. By 15:00 hrs the brigades were deployed; 59th Brigade on the left (north) between the Omignon and the village of Vaux-en-Vermandos 3.2 miles (5.1 km) to the south east, 60th Brigade (reinforced with three companies of the 11th D.L.I.), in the centre between Vaux-en-Vermandos and the Somme 4.6 miles (7.4 km) to the south and the 61st Brigade astride the Somme between the villages of Tugney-en-Pont and Saint-Simon, 1.3 miles (2.1 km) to the south east.

During the night of 21 March the 36th Division was forced to retire south of the Somme with the 61st Brigade and 91st Artillery Brigade covering them, at which point they came under the orders of that division. During 22 March the 60th Brigade came under artillery attack, and the 59th Brigade was moved into a rear area due to the Corps to the north being out flanked. Further movements meant that by the evening of 22 March the 59th and 60th Brigades were acting as a rearguard for the corps between Lancy (7.3 miles (11.7 km) east of Saint Quentin), Douilly (2.25 miles (3.62 km) south of Lancy) and Bray-Saint-Christophe (3.7 miles (6.0 km) south east of Douilly). During the night the brigades were ordered to retire across the Somme, some 2.8 miles (4.5 km) to the south west, and conducted a fighting withdrawal as they did so. The engineer companies completed the destruction of the bridges across the canalised river. On 23 March the division held the Somme canal line from 2 miles (3.2 km) west of Ham, held by the 11th D.L.I. and parties men from other divisions, to Béthencourt-sur-Somme 4 miles (6.4 km) to the north west, held by the 11th R.B. Reinforced by the 182nd Brigade, the 60th Brigade fought back the Germans breaking through at Ham, and later in the day the division received more reinforcements, exchanging the 182nd Brigade for the other brigades (183rd and 184th) from the 61st Division, and two batteries of a Canadian motor machine gun battalion. During the night of 23 March it became obvious from the noises they were making that the Germans were preparing to cross the canal at many points.

On 24 March the Somme was crossed and the division was attacked on both flanks and the centre, aided by German artillery, trench mortaring and aircraft. Counter-attacks temporarily held up the German advance, but at a heavy cost, the 11th R.B. losing two companies almost in their entirety and the 2nd Scottish Rifles, one. By mid-morning the right of the line 1,400 yards (1,300 m) from the Somme, behind the village of Canizy was being held by a platoon from the 83rd Field Company and an assortment of stragglers with an open right flank. By the afternoon the Germans had forced the 8th and 30th Divisions out of contact with the 20th Division and it was forced to fall back a further 2.5 miles (4.0 km) on a north east facing line between Mesnil-Saint-Nicaise and Buverchy on the Canal-du-nord 3.75 miles (6.04 km) away. The 183rd Brigade formed a northern flank, south of them were the mixed up troops of 59th brigade, and the 60th Brigade on the south flank. During the afternoon the division was reinforced by four companies of French troops from the French 22nd Division and a French machine gun company.

That night, the 59th Brigade on the north flank, now reinforced with the 25th Entrenching Battalion and the Divisional Reinforcement Battalion (formed a week before from details from all branches of the division) and a mixed batch of men from the 8th and 61st divisions, was forced back 2 miles (3.2 km) by a renewed German attack. By the next morning (25 March) the Germans were continually turning the division's left (northern) flank, and by the afternoon only 62 officers and men of A company, 2nd Scottish Rifles escaped the Germans. On the 60th Brigade front the headquarters of the 12th K.R.R.C. was captured that evening, by which time the division was forming a new line 2.5 miles (4.0 km) to the rear. The 61st Brigade returned to the division, after a hard retreat, often out of contact with the 36th Division, and at one point holding a line 6,000 yards (5,500 m) long with two battalions. Including companies from the 11th D.L.I. and 20th MG Battalion, the brigade had been reduced to a strength of nine junior officers and 440 men, and was reformed into a four company composite battalion (headquarters, King's, S.L.I. and D.C.L.I. companies). The 91st Artillery Brigade remained under orders of the French 9th Division.

The same day the division came under orders of the French 133rd Division and was ordered to withdraw to Roye, where the division's headquarters had retired to, 10.5 miles (16.9 km) south west from the division line on 23 March, and then on to Le Quesnel a further 9 miles (14 km) north west. With the Germans only 4 miles (6.4 km) away to the north, the 61st Brigade composite battalion was tasked with forming the left flank between the villages of Gruny, Crémery and Laincourt. The Germans were already in Laincourt, as were French units and a confused night was had with British, French and Germans patrols challenging each other in their different languages. The 59th and 60th Brigades had withdrawn to Roye by midnight 25 March, and set out for Le Quesnel at 07:00 hrs on 26 March, by which time the composite battalion had been pushed back 2 miles (3.2 km), during that day the D.C.L.I. company fought for nearly 12 hours at the village of Parville-le-Quesnoy, and withdrew with only two officers and nine men from an original 106 of all ranks.

On 27 March the division was holding a 2.5 miles (4.0 km) line east of Le Quesnel across the Roye-Amiens road behind the 30th Division, with 60th Brigade to the south, 59th Brigade in the centre and the 61st Brigade composite battalion to the north reinforced with the 678 officers and men of the 25th Entrenching Battalion. The 59th and 60th Brigade came under attack that day as the Germans pushed back the line and attempted to outflank the division to the south. Before dawn on 28 March the 59th and 61st Brigades were relieved by 401st regiment of the French 133rd Division. The relief of the 60th Brigade was interrupted by a heavy German attack affecting the 6th K.S.L.I., 12th R.B. and the 11th D.L.I., which included accurate artillery and machine gun fire. The brigade managed to extricate itself and by 15:00 hrs had rejoined the rest of the division near Demuin 4.5 miles (7.2 km) north west of Le Quesnel.

The division now came under order of XIX Corps, and became part of the corps hard pressed right flank. On 29 March it was deployed between the villages of Demuin and Mézières-en-Santerre, 2 miles (3.2 km) to the south east across the Roye-Amiens road. The 59th Brigade, now reduced to 770 men, held the south of the line and 61st Brigade composite battalion the north, 60th Brigade was in reserve. The 92nd Artillery Brigade rejoined the division. The Germans attacked at mid-day and forced the south flank, reinforcements from the much depleted 149th Brigade of 50th (Northumbrian) Division were received (1/4th, 1/5th and 1/6th Northumberland Fusiliers, themselves needing reinforcement from the 4th East Yorkshire Regiment, 5th D.L.I. and the 22nd Entrenching Battalion, of the 50th Division), the 60th Brigade was brought out of reserve, and the division was ordered to recapture Mézières, from which the French had been driven. The 60th Brigade attacked at 16:00 hrs and although men from the three weakened battalions involved (12th K.R.R.C., 12 R.B. and 11th D.L.I., the last only 140 strong) succeeded in reaching the far side of the village, a simultaneous attack by the Germans on Villers-aux-Érables (1,100 yards (1,000 m) to the east) left them with an open flank and they were forced to retire despite taking 50 prisoners and destroying a battery of German trench mortars. A counter-attack by the 149th Brigade restored the southern flank.

By the morning of 30 March the division and its reinforcements held the road from Demuin to Moreuil 3.75 miles (6.04 km) to the south west. This was held during that day with the help of troops from the 2nd Cavalry Division. The next day (31 March) the division was continually attacked and was forced back, despite counter-attacks by 59th and 149th brigades supported by the 92nd Artillery Brigade, by repeated out flanking moves, the 60th Brigade losing what was left of D company 12th K.R.R.C. in its entirety. A final counterattack by the remaining 120 men of 6th K.S.L.I. the remnants of 11th D.L.I. and cavalry troops succeeded in maintaining a bridgehead south of Dormant-sur-la-Luce over the river Luce 9.5 miles (15.3 km) south east of Amiens. On the night of 1 April the division, less the artillery, was withdrawn from the front.

The division's artillery continued supporting British, French and Australian troops in the Somme area, and switched commands frequently, with batteries occasionally detached to other formations. Both of the division's artillery brigades were in the same part of the line, near Villers-Bretonneux by 17 April although under different commands (58th (2/1st London) Division and 5th Australian Division respectively). They were to take part in the battle of Villers-Bretonneux coming under sustained bombardment and heavy gas attacks, with some of the gunners of 91st Artillery Brigade acting as infantry, and B and D batteries of the 92nd firing over open sights at times on 24 March. The 91st Artillery Brigade was relieved on 25 March, the 92nd on 27 March, in both brigades artillery and the supply columns suffered heavy losses.

==== Lens ====
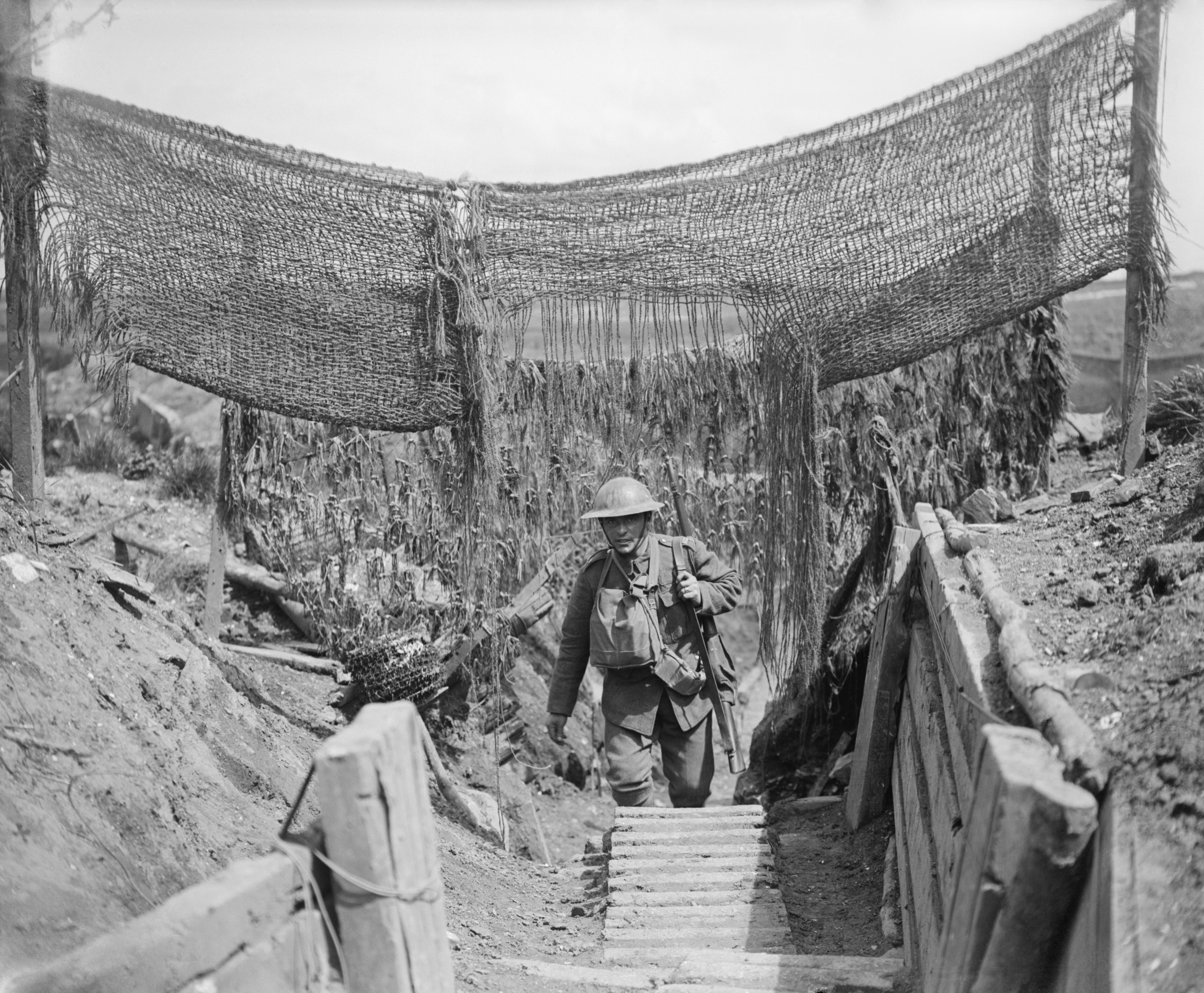
Soldier of the 20th Light Division (Machine Gun Corps from the shoulder title) in a communication trench with camouflage netting to prevent enemy observation in front of Lens, 14 May 1918. IWM Q6631

The division was moved to near Abbeville, in order to rest and absorb replacements for its losses. The 61st Composite Battalion had been reduced to less than 100 men, and the other brigades were similarly weakened. On 17 April the division was moved to Villers-Châtel about 10 miles (16 km) north west of Arras, returning to XVIII Corps control, this time under First Army. It remained there training its replacements until the end of April. Between 1 and 3 May the division relieved the 3rd Canadian Division in the Lens-Avion sector, either side of the river Souchez, where the artillery rejoined it. The 24th Division was to the left, and from 7 May the 52nd (Lowland) Division on the right. The German defences were based along the embankment of a curving section of railway line, known as the 'Bull Ring' in the southern part of the line, the flooding of the land adjacent to the river, which was overlooked by a slag heap occupied by the Germans in the centre, and the widespread building ruins of the area strengthened with barbed wire traps all along the division's front. Beginning almost immediately the division began to patrol in 'no-mans-land' and conduct trench raids. These raids had the aim of obtaining identification of the German units in the area so that a picture could be built up of German force movements during the other sequences of their Spring Offensive and later defensive moves. One such raid during the night of 23–4 July was conducted by whole companies from the 11th K.R.R.C. and 12th King's, two platoons from the 7th D.C.L.I. and one platoon from the 7th S.L.I., also involved in many of these raids were engineers from the field companies carrying explosive charges sufficient to destroy the German's dug-outs. These raids were closely supported by the artillery, trench mortars and machine gunners. The raids met with varying degrees of success, and both sides frequently used gas in this sector.

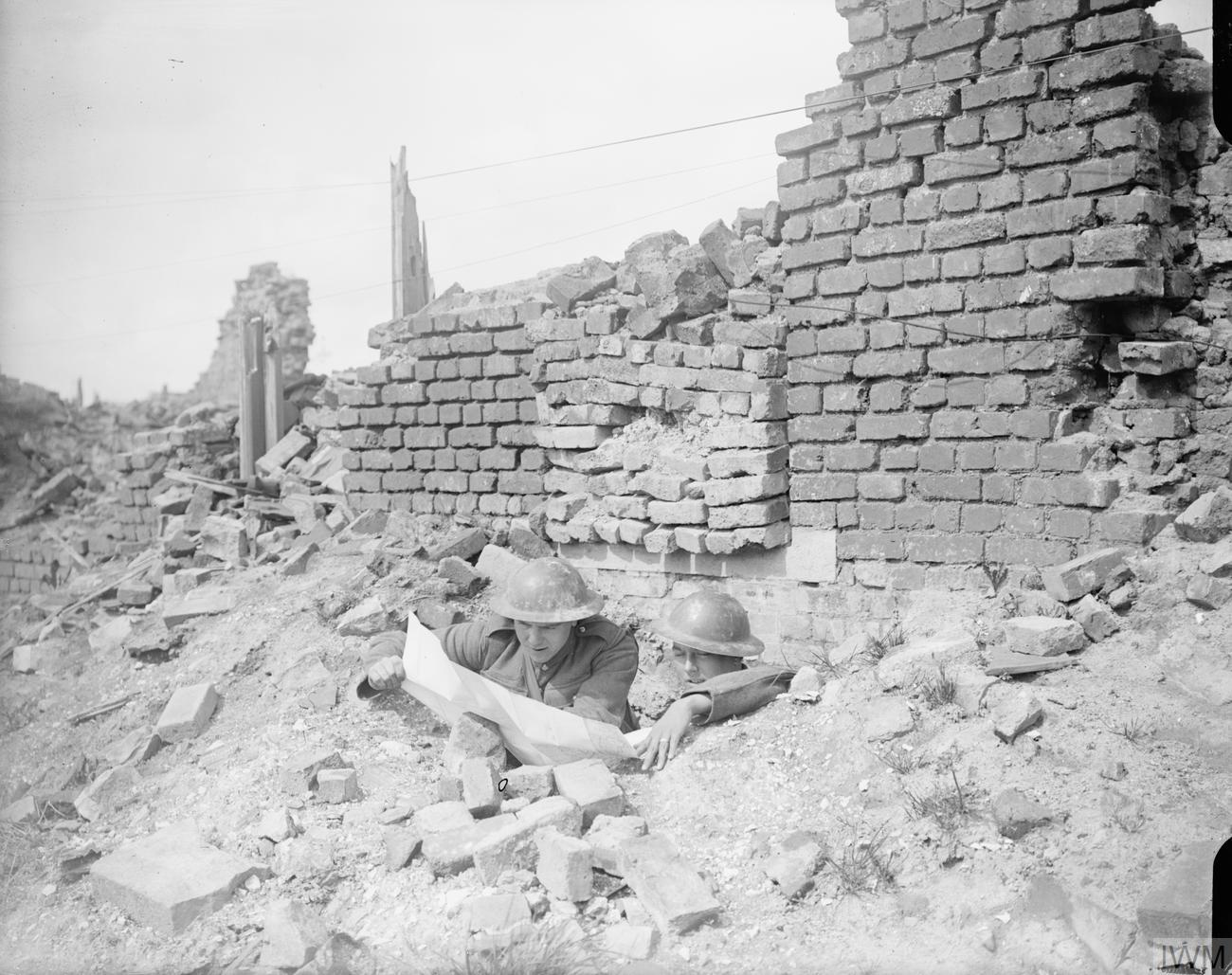
Two men of the King's Royal Rifle Corps (20th Division) checking a map at the entrance to their dug out under a ruined house in Lievin, 14 May 1918.

On 27 August the whole division moved to the right, entirely south of the river Souchez on a three brigade front, patrolling and trench raiding were continued. At the end of September the First Army was ordered to advance along with the rest of the front. The initial moves of this by the 20th Division were an attack on the lines south of Lens at Acheville carried out by the 7th D.C.L.I, which on the night of 27–28 September captured 1,200 yards (1,100 m) of the German front line trench and held it against a counter-attack the next day. On 2 October, seeing that the Germans were withdrawing to the Hindenburg Line, the division advanced on a front of six battalions from all three brigades (from the left: 7th D.C.L.I, 12th King's, 12th K.R.R.C., 6th K.S.L.I., 2nd Scottish Rifles and 11th K.R.R.C., with the remainder in reserve). With the close support of the artillery, advances of up to 1,000 yards (910 m) were made across the 'Bull Ring' and the village of Méricourt was entered, there Pte. James Towers of the 2nd Scottish Rifles won the V.C. after volunteering to take a message to a trapped patrol after five other messengers had been killed, he subsequently led the patrol to safety after dark. The Germans left many machine gun nests to slow the pursuit, which were slowly overrun. The division was relieved between 5 and 8 October by the 12th (Eastern) Division, except for the artillery which was sent to the Chérisy – Foutaine area 7 miles (11 km) south east of Arras.

==== Hundred Days ====
The division spent the rest of the month training around Monchy-Breton, and did not take part in the general advance through Flanders until early November. Then, the division and its artillery (under orders of the 19th (Western) Division) were both moved to the Cambrai area.

The artillery supported attacks by the 19th Division on 4 November, at Jenlain 19 miles (31 km) to the north west of Cambrai, at Roisin on 6 November, Bavay on 8 November, a further 3 miles (4.8 km) and 5 miles (8.0 km) further on respectively. The advance was not unhindered and both artillery brigades were shelled and machine gunned, the C battery of the 91st having an ammunition dump blown up. By 9 November the artillery was a further 8 miles (13 km) further on, some 6 miles (9.7 km) south of Mons, where it came under orders of the 24th Division.

The remainder of the division moved up behind the leading troops and by 9 November was in Bavay. On 7 November the division had been made responsible for feeding the civilians in the areas it held, it also set up soup kitchens for the refugees heading east before sending them on. On 10 November the 60th Brigade was placed under orders on 24th Division and relieved the 73rd and 74th Brigade on the front, east of the Mons-Maubeuge road 2 miles (3.2 km) north of Maubeuge. Here the 12th K.R.R.C. lost a Regimental Sergeant Major Rawson, who had landed with the division in France in 1915. The 12th K.R.R.C. and 12th R.B were at the front when the armistice came into effect.

In late November, the division was concentrated around Marieux, 11 miles (18 km) north west of Albert and began disbanding in January 1919.

During the war the division lost 35,470 mean killed, wounded and missing.

== Order of battle ==
The following unites served with the division:

59th Brigade

- 10th (Service) Battalion, King's Royal Rifle Corps (disbanded February 1918)
- 11th (Service) Battalion, King's Royal Rifle Corps
- 10th (Service) Battalion, Rifle Brigade (disbanded February 1918)
- 11th (Service) Battalion, Rifle Brigade
- 2nd Battalion, Cameronians (Scottish Rifles) (joined February 1918)
- 59th Machine Gun Company (joined 3 March 1916, left to form 20th Battalion Machine Gun Corps (M.G.C.) 15 March 1918)
- 59th Trench Mortar Battery (formed July 1916)

60th Brigade

- 6th (Service) Battalion, Oxfordshire and Buckinghamshire Light Infantry ( disbanded February 1918)
- 6th (Service) Battalion, King's Shropshire Light Infantry
- 12th (Service) Battalion, King's Royal Rifle Corps
- 12th (Service) Battalion, Rifle Brigade
- 60th Machine Gun Company (joined 3 March 1916, left to form 20th Battalion M.G.C. 15 March 1918)
- 60th Trench Mortar Battery (formed July 1916)

61st Brigade

- 7th (Service) Battalion, Somerset Light Infantry
- 7th (Service) Battalion, Duke of Cornwall's Light Infantry
- 7th (Service) Battalion, King's Own Yorkshire Light Infantry ( disbanded February 1918)
- 11th (Service) Battalion, Durham Light Infantry (to division pioneers January 1915)
- 12th (Service) Battalion, King's (Liverpool Regiment) (from division troops January 1915)
- 61st Machine Gun Company (joined 3 March 1916, left to form 20th Battalion M.G.C. 15 March 1918)
- 61st Trench Mortar Battery (formed July 1916)

Divisional troops

- 12th Battalion, King's (Liverpool Regiment) ( to 61st Brigade January 1915)
- 11th Battalion, Durham Light Infantry (pioneers) (from 61st Brigade January 1915)
- 9th Battalion, Devonshire Regiment (left April 1915)
- 14th Motor Machine Gun Battery (joined 26 January 1915 left 22 April 1916)
- Division Mounted Troops
  - HQ, D Sqn and MG Section, Westmorland and Cumberland Yeomanry (joined 24 June 1915 left 29 April 1916)
  - 20th Divisional Cyclist Company, Army Cyclist Corps (formed 22 December 1914, left 17 May 1916)
- 217th Company, M.G.C. (joined March 1917, moved into 20th Battalion M.G.C. 15 March 1918)
- 20th Battalion Machine Gun Corps (formed 15 March 1918 absorbing brigade MG companies)
- 20th Divisional Train Army Service Corps
  - 158th, 159th, 160th and 161st Companies
- 32nd Mobile Veterinary Section Army Veterinary Corps
- 221st Divisional Employment Company (joined 30 June 1917)

Royal Artillery

- XC Brigade, Royal Field Artillery (R.F.A.) (broken up 30 August 1916)
- XCI Brigade, R.F.A.
- XCII (Howitzer) Brigade, R.F.A.
- XCIII Brigade, R.F.A. (left December 1916)
- 20th Divisional Ammunition Column R.F.A.
- 20th Heavy Battery, Royal Garrison Artillery (raised with the Division but moved independently to France in August 1915)
- V.20 Heavy Trench Mortar Battery R.F.A. (formed May 1916, broken up 2 February 1918)
- X.20, Y.20 and Z.20 Medium Mortar Batteries R.F.A. (formed May 1916; Z battery broken up in February 1918, and distributed to X and Y batteries)

Royal Engineers

- 83rd Field Company
- 84th Field Company
- 96th Field Company (from 26th Division in January 1915)
- 20th Divisional Signals Company

Royal Army Medical Corps

- 60th Field Ambulance
- 61st Field Ambulance
- 62nd Field Ambulance
- 33rd Sanitary Section (left 24 April 1917)

== Victoria Cross recipients ==
- Major Edward Cooper 12th King's Royal Rifle Corps
- Major Wilfred Edwards 7th King's Own Yorkshire Light Infantry
- Sergeant David Jones (VC) 12th King's (Liverpool) Regiment
- Lieutenant George Allan Maling R.A.M.C.
- Rifleman Albert Edward Shepherd 12th King's Royal Rifle Corps
- Private James Towers 2nd Cameronians (Scottish Rifles

== Memorial ==
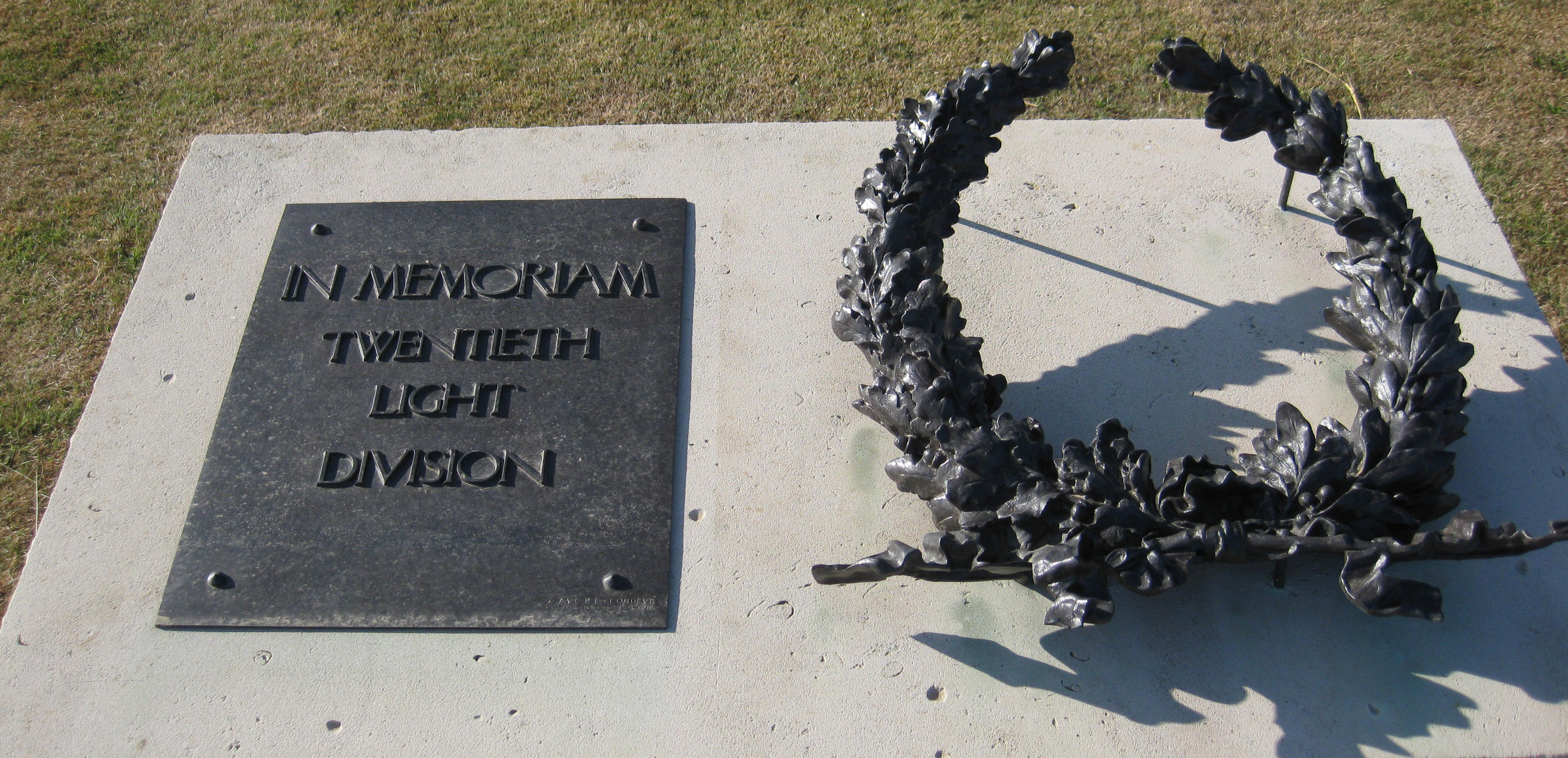
Memorial to the division close to Delville Wood in the Somme

== General Officer Commanding ==
Rank	Name	Dates	Notes	Ref.
Major-General	Sir E. O. F. Hamilton	15 September – 19 October 1914		
Brigadier-General	R. H. Davies	19 October 1914 – 20 February 1915	Promoted major-general 26 October 1914	
Brigadier-General	J. Hotham	20 February – 20 March 1915	Acting	
Major-General	R. H. Davies	20 March 1915 – 8 March 1916		
Major-General	W. Douglas Smith	8 March 1916 – 19 March 1917		
Major-General	T. G. Matheson	19 March – 9 August 1917		
Major-General	W. Douglas-Smith	9 August 1917 – 3 April 1918		
Major-General	G. G. S. Carey	3 April – 11 November 1918		

== Battle insignia ==
The practice of wearing battalion specific insignia (often called battle patches) in the B.E.F. began in mid 1915 with the arrival of units of Kitchener's Armies and was widespread after the Somme Battles of 1916. The patches shown were adopted by the division during late 1917, and were designed to an overall divisional scheme of a simple shape for each brigade and a number of stripes below that indicating the seniority of the battalion (according to the regimental order of precedence).

From left to right, top row: 10th, 11th King's Royal Rifle Corps, 10th, 11th Rifle Brigade. Bottom row: brigade H.Q., 59th machine gun company and 59th trench mortar battery. The 11th K.R.R.C. also wore a green diamond with an '11' over '60th' in red on helmet coverings.
From left to right, top row: 6th Oxford and Buckinghamshire Light Infantry, 6th King's Shropshire Light Infantry, 12th K.R.R.C., 12th Rifle Brigade. Bottom row: brigade H.Q., 60th machine gun company and 60th trench mortar battery. Before the adoption of the divisional scheme the 6th K.S.L.I. wore a green oval embroidered with 'VI' above a regimental badge.
From left to right, top row: 12th King's Regiment, 7th Somerset Light Infantry, 7th Duke of Cornwall's Light Infantry, 7th King's Own Yorkshire Light Infantry. Bottom row: brigade H.Q, 61st machine gun company and 61st trench mortar battery. Before the adoption of the divisional scheme the 7th S.L.I. wore a rifle green horizontal rectangle on the right sleeve.

== See also ==
- List of British divisions in World War I

== Bibliography ==
- Becke, A. F. (1938). Order of Battle of Divisions Part 3A. London: His Majesty's Stationery Office.
- Chappell, Mike (1986). British Battle Insignia (1). 1914–18. Oxford: Osprey Publishing. ISBN 9780850457278.
- Hammond, Bryn (2008). Cambrai 1917 (1 ed.). London: Phoenix. ISBN 9780753826058.
- Hart, Peter (2009). 1918. A Very British Victory (2 ed.). London: Orion Books Ltd. ISBN 9780753826898.
- Hibbard, Mike; Gibbs, Gary (2016). Infantry Divisions, Identification Schemes 1917 (1 ed.). Wokingham: The Military History Society.
- Inglefield, Capt. V.E. (2016). The History of the Twentieth (Light) Division (Naval and Military Press ed.). London: Nesbit & Co. Ltd. ISBN 9781843424093.
- Miles, Capt. Wilfrid (2012) [1920]. The Durham Forces in the Field (Naval and Military Press ed.). London. ISBN 9781845740733.
- Sandilands, H. R. (2003) [1925]. The 23rd Division 1914–1919 (Naval & Military Press ed.). Edinburgh: Wm. Blackwood. ISBN 1-84342-641-2.
- Wyrall, E. (2002) [1939]. The History of the 50th Division, 1914–1919 (Naval & Military Press ed.). London: P. Lund, Humphries. ISBN 1-84342-206-9. OCLC 613336235.
