= Richard Hutton Davies =

British Army general (1861–1918)

Major-General Richard Hutton Davies CB
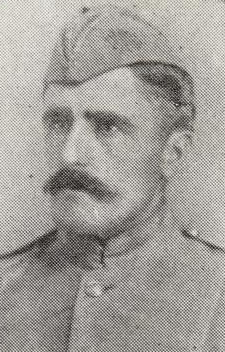
- Davies in 1899
- Born: 14 August 1861; London, England
- Died: 9 May 1918 (aged 56); London, England
- Military career
- Allegiance: New Zealand; United Kingdom
- Branch: New Zealand Military Forces; British Army
- Service years: 1893–1918
- Rank: Major-General
- Commands: Hawera Mounted Rifle Volunteers; Third New Zealand Contingent; Fourth New Zealand Contingent; Eighth New Zealand Contingent; 6th Brigade; 20th (Light) Division
- Conflicts: Second Boer War; First World War
- Awards: Companion of the Order of the Bath; Mentioned in Despatches (3)

Major-General Richard Hutton Davies, CB (14 August 1861 – 9 May 1918) was an officer of the New Zealand Military Forces during the late nineteenth and early twentieth centuries, the first New Zealander to command an independent force overseas and one of the most senior New Zealand officers during the First World War.

Born in London, he emigrated to New Zealand after leaving school, where he worked as a surveyor. He joined a volunteer militia unit in 1893, and went to South Africa as an officer with the first New Zealand contingent sent to the Boer War in 1899. He later commanded the third, fourth and eighth contingents, becoming the first New Zealand officer to command an independent unit on active service overseas. Following his return to New Zealand, he became inspector-general of the New Zealand Military Forces, and in 1909 was attached to a British Army brigade to gain staff experience.

This led to him being offered command of 6th Brigade, a regular infantry brigade of British troops, in 1910; he was the first colonial officer to hold such a position. In the summer of 1914 the brigade was mobilised with the British Expeditionary Force, and he commanded it at the Battle of Mons and the First Battle of the Aisne before being invalided back to England due to exhaustion. He was given command of the newly formed 20th (Light) Division, which he took to France in 1915, but was relieved of command early in 1916. After a period in command of a reserve centre in Staffordshire, he was sent to hospital suffering from both mental and physical ill health, and committed suicide in May 1918.

== Early life and family ==
Davies was born in London, the son of a journalist, and was educated at Hurstpierpoint College. After leaving school, he emigrated to New Zealand, where he spent two years working for a relative before settling at Taranaki, setting up a farm and practising as a surveyor. He married Ida Mary Cornwall in February 1886; they had two sons and a daughter. One son, Henry Cornwall Davies, served with the New Zealand Expeditionary Force during the First World War, and, like his father, transferred to the British Army in 1915, becoming a captain in the Royal Engineers. Ida died in pregnancy with their fourth child in December 1906; he remarried, to Ida's sister Eileen Kathleen Cornwall, in May 1908.

In October 1887 Davies became the surveyor to the Manganui Road Board. On 10 April 1893, he joined the Hawera Mounted Rifle Volunteers, and was commissioned as a lieutenant in May 1895; he was quickly promoted to captain six weeks later, becoming the commander of the unit. He was also active in local government, and in February 1897 was elected a member of the New Plymouth Harbour Board, representing Taranaki North.

== South Africa ==
On 3 October 1899 Davies transferred into the Permanent Force of the New Zealand Militia, where he was made responsible for the training of volunteer mounted units. The Boer War, however, was declared a week later; Davies was quickly seconded to command a company of the volunteer First New Zealand Contingent being sent to the Cape. The contingent sailed on 21 October, arrived in late November, and was on active service within a week. Davies was promoted to major in May 1900, and in the same month was given temporary command of the Third New Zealand Contingent. He was transferred to the Rhodesian Field Force, where he commanded the Fourth New Zealand Contingent in August 1900.

He established a high professional reputation commanding the unit, and was promoted to lieutenant colonel and made a Companion of the Order of the Bath (CB), as well as winning the respect of his men – one described him as "not only liked but loved". A soldier wrote home calling Davies, who stood five feet six inches tall, "a grand little chap", whilst another noted with pleasure that Davies objected to "Imperial ideas of discipline" being forced upon his men.

After being mentioned in despatches in May 1901 he returned home to command the Auckland Military District, but was ordered back to South Africa in command of the eighth New Zealand Contingent, in February 1902, with the brevet rank of colonel. The contingent operated as a single unit, unlike its predecessors, and Davies became the first officer from New Zealand to command an independent force on active service overseas.

== Military reform ==
Returning to New Zealand in late 1902, Davies resumed command of the Auckland military district. He held command until 1906, when he was appointed inspector-general of the New Zealand Military Forces and became a member of the Council of Defence, the body responsible for controlling the dominion's military forces. The position of inspector-general, newly created that year, was originally expected to go to an "Imperial" – that is, British – officer, but the government had announced it planned to rotate New Zealand officers in the role, on up to five-year terms, so as to allow them to gain experience.

Davies threw himself into the role, travelling around the country and inspecting local units to gain an overall idea of their efficiency. Even under favourable circumstances, however, he found that only 54% of the volunteers attended parades in 1906; at the annual camps, the proportion was as low as 45%. He pressed for greater use of active day-time tactical training rather than evening indoors drill, which he felt was key for a part-time volunteer force, and for a greater emphasis on the training and standards of officers. By the end of his second year in office, he had organised local selection boards for appointing officers, and a central promotion board for senior field officers, as well as mandatory regular fitness and efficiency tests.

As a member of the Council of Defence, he strongly supported the movement for universal military training – not conventional conscription, but rather a form of basic military training on a part-time basis for all adult men – arguing that it would mean "the flower of the nation would be the soldiers, not the weeds".

== British service ==
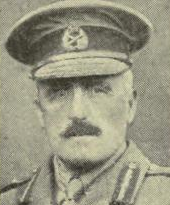
Davies as a major-general

After three years as inspector-general, and in order to gain staff experience, Davies was attached as an observer to a number of units in the United Kingdom in 1909–10. During this time, he also attended the Imperial Defence Conference and represented the New Zealand forces at the funeral of King Edward VII. At the end of the one-year attachment, he had so impressed the British Army that they offered him an appointment as commander of 6th Brigade in October 1910, with the temporary rank of brigadier general. He was also promoted to the local rank of colonel while in this post, with seniority being backdated to January 1902. As such, he became the first overseas officer to command a regular brigade, only eleven years after taking up a permanent military commission.

Davies' tenure in command of 6th Brigade was due to expire in October 1914, when he was to hand over command to John Keir, and it was rumoured in New Zealand that he might be appointed as general officer commanding the Home Forces in 1915, succeeding Alexander Godley. However, with the outbreak of the First World War in August 1914, his command was mobilised as part of 2nd Division in the British Expeditionary Force and sent to France. The brigade saw heavy combat at the Battle of Mons, where Davies was mentioned in despatches, but he was quickly worn down by his habit of always marching at the head of his brigade, which put him under heavy physical and mental strain, and from the lasting effects of an attack of pneumonia earlier in the year. One report described him as "much changed, full of nerves ... very jumpy". He was relieved of command after the First Battle of the Aisne in September and ordered home, being replaced by Colonel Robert Fanshawe, formerly GSO 1 of 1st Division, on 20 September.

He was appointed a divisional commander, with the rank of temporary major general, on 19 October 1914, and took command of the newly raised 20th (Light) Division at some point in September–October. This made him the first New Zealand officer to command a division in the war. On 18 February 1915, he was formally transferred to the British Army, and his rank of major general was made permanent.

The 20th Division moved to France from England in July 1915, and he commanded it during a minor operation in September, but handed over command on 8 March 1916 due to ill-health. He was appointed to command a reserve centre at Cannock Chase, Staffordshire, where the arrival of elements of the New Zealand Rifle Brigade in September 1917 meant that he once again had the opportunity to command his own countrymen. He was relieved of command by Major-General Robert Wanless O'Gowan in March 1918, and on 9 May 1918, after a prolonged period of physical and mental ill health, he committed suicide at the Special Neurological Hospital for Officers, Kensington. He was buried in London at Brompton Cemetery.

== See also ==
- List of New Zealand units in the Second Boer War

== Notes ==
Military offices
Preceded by Edward Hamilton	GOC 20th (Light) Division; 1914–1916	Succeeded by William Smith
