= 59th Brigade (United Kingdom) =

Formation in the British Army during World War I

- Active: 14 September 1914–28 May 1919
- Country: United Kingdom
- Branch: New Army
- Type: Infantry
- Size: Brigade
- Part of: 20th (Light) Division
- Nickname: Greenjacket Brigade

59th Brigade (59th Bde) was an infantry formation of the British Army during World War I. It was formed in September 1914 as part of the new army also known as Kitchener's Army and was assigned to the 20th (Light) Division, serving on the Western Front. It was popularly known as the 'Greenjacket Brigade' (Note: Not to be confused with the Green Jackets Brigade, an official administrative brigade of the British Army 1946–66.) because it was composed of battalions of the King's Royal Rifle Corps and the Rifle Brigade, whose full dress uniforms were Rifle green.

== Origin ==
On 6 August 1914, less than 48 hours after Britain's declaration of war, Parliament sanctioned an increase of 500,000 men for the Regular British Army. The newly-appointed Secretary of State for War, Earl Kitchener of Khartoum, issued his famous call to arms: 'Your King and Country Need You', urging the first 100,000 volunteers to come forward. Men flooded into the recruiting offices and the 'first hundred thousand' were enlisted within days. This group of six infantry divisions with supporting arms became known as Kitchener's First New Army, or 'K1'. Recruits continued to arrive in large numbers, and Army Order No 382 of 11 September authorised a further six divisions (15th–20th), which became the Second New Army (K2). 20th (Light) Division began forming at Aldershot with the 59th, 60th and 61st Brigades.

== Order of Battle ==
The brigade was composed as follows:

- 10th (Service) Battalion, King's Royal Rifle Corps – disbanded 5 February 1918
- 11th (Service) Battalion, King's Royal Rifle Corps
- 10th (Service) Battalion, Rifle Brigade – disbanded 4–14 February 1918
- 11th (Service) Battalion, Rifle Brigade
- 59th Company, Machine Gun Corps – joined 3 March 1916; joined 20th Divisional MG Battalion 15 March 1918
- 59th Trench Mortar Battery – 59/1 Bty formed by 16 April 1916, 52/2 Bty by 25 April, and combined to form 59th Bty by 16 July
- 2nd Battalion, Cameronians (Scottish Rifles) – joined from 23rd Brigade, 8th Division, 3 February 1918

== Service ==
20th (Light) Division crossed to France in July 1915 and completed its concentration in the area west of Saint-Omer by 26 July. Thereafter it served on the Western Front in the following operations:

1915

- Attack towards Fromelles 25 September

1916

- Battle of Mont Sorrel 2–13 June
- Battle of the Somme
  - Battle of Delville Wood 21 August–3 September
  - Battle of Guillemont 3–5 September
  - Battle of Flers–Courcelette 16–20 September
  - Battle of Morval 27 September
  - Battle of the Transloy Ridges 1–8 October

1917

- German Retreat to the Hindenburg Line 14 March–5 April
- Actions on the Hindenburg Line 26 May–16 June
- Third Battle of Ypres
  - Battle of Langemarck 16–18 August
  - Battle of the Menin Road Ridge 20–25 September
  - Battle of Polygon Wood 26–28 September
- Battle of Cambrai
  - The Tank Attack 20–21 November
  - Capture of Bourlon Wood 23–28 November
  - German Counter-Attacks 30 November–2 December

1918

- German spring offensive
  - Battle of St Quentin 22–23 March
  - Actions at the Somme Crossings 24–25 March
  - Battle of Rosières 26–27 March
- Final Advance in Artois 2–6 October

Following the Armistice with Germany demobilisation of 20th (L) Division began in January 1919 and the division and its formations ceased to exist on 28 May 1919.

59th Brigade was not reactivated in World War II.

== Commanders ==
The following officers commanded the brigade:

- Brigadier-General G.F. Leslie from 14 September 1914
- Brig-Gen C.D. Shute from 6 July 1915
- Brig-Gen R.C. Browne-Clayton from 14 October 1916
- Brig-Gen H.H.G. Hyslop from 26 August 1918
- Brig-Gen R.M. Ovens from 3 April 1918
- Brig-Gen A.C. Baylay from 8 June 1918

== Insignia ==
Top row: left to right: 10th, 11th KRRC, 10th, 11th Rifle Brigade; bottom row: brigade HQ, 59th MG Co, 59th Trench Mortar Bty.

The formation sign of 20th (L) Division was a white circle bearing a black cross with a red bull's-eye at the centre. In the summer of 1917 the division adopted a comprehensive scheme for battalion identification signs worn on both sleeves. These were black geometric shapes, with 59th Bde using circles. Underneath, one, two, three or four bars indicated the battalion's seniority. 11th KRRC (the former 60th Foot) also wore a Rifle green diamond with '11' over '60th' in red on its helmet coverings.
