= Edward Hamilton (British Army officer) =

British army officer

Major-General Sir Edward Hamilton KCB
- Born: 17 February 1854
- Died: 30 March 1944 (aged 90)
- Military career
- Allegiance: United Kingdom
- Branch: British Army
- Service years: 1873–1914
- Rank: Major-General
- Unit: Queen's Royal Regiment
- Commands: 2nd Battalion Queen's Royal Regiment; 2nd Brigade; GOC West Africa; GOC and Lieutenant-Governor Guernsey; 20th (Light) Division
- Conflicts: Second Anglo-Afghan War; Third Anglo-Burmese War; Second Boer War; First World War
- Awards: Knight Commander of the Order of the Bath; Mentioned in Despatches

Major-General Sir Edward Owen Fisher Hamilton KCB (17 February 1854 – 30 March 1944) was an officer of the British Army during the late 19th century. Originally a junior officer in the Queen's Royal Regiment, he oversaw signalling in the Indian Army during the late nineteenth century, before commanding a battalion and then a brigade in the South African War. He was later the commanding officer for Army forces in West Africa and Lieutenant Governor of Guernsey before retiring in 1914; on the outbreak of the First World War, he briefly returned from retirement to command a division in the New Armies.

== Early career ==
Officers of the 1st Battalion, 2nd Regiment of Foot, in Poona, India, 1877. Lieutenant E. O. F. Hamilton stands on the extreme left.

Hamilton was born in Ireland in 1854, the son of WJ Hamilton of Fiddown, County Kilkenny. After studying at the Hermitage School, Bath, joined the army as a lieutenant in the 1st Battalion, 2nd Regiment of Foot, on 9 August 1873. He served in the Second Anglo-Afghan War from 1878 to 1880 as the aide-de-camp to General J. M. Primrose, and was mentioned in despatches.

In 1883 he was promoted to captain, and served with the 2nd Battalion in the Third Anglo-Burmese War before being appointed a brigade-major under Sir William Lockhart in 1887. He then was appointed a brigade-major at Cawnpore from 1887 to 1888, continuing in India as the Inspector of Signals in the Punjab and Bengal from 1888 to 1893. During this period, he oversaw signals in the Hazara Expedition of 1891. He married Isabel Harris, daughter of General Philip H. F. Harris, in 1886; they had one son and two daughters. The best man at their wedding was Hubert Hamilton, a fellow captain in the regiment.

He served in the Tochi Valley in 1895 under Lockhart, and served on the staff of the Malakand Field Force in 1897. He returned to field service that same year with the 2nd Battalion, Queen's Royal Regiment, as the second-in-command of the Tirah Expedition, with a brevet-promotion to lieutenant colonel on 29 September 1898.

== Regimental and senior command ==
Officers of the 1st Battalion, Queen's Royal Regiment, at Bordon Camp, Hampshire, 11 August 1914. Seated in the centre of the second row is the colonel of the regiment, Major General Sir Edward Hamilton.

He commanded the 2nd Battalion, the Queen's Royal Regiment during the early stages of the Second Boer War, in 1899, and then commanded the 2nd Brigade from April 1900 to the end of hostilities in May 1902. For his services in South Africa, he was mentioned in despatches and appointed a Companion of the Order of the Bath (CB) in the South Africa honours list published on 26 June 1902. He left Cape Town on board the SS Walmer Castle in late June 1902, and arrived at Southampton the following month. His period of service in command of the 2nd battalion ended in late September 1902, when he was placed on half-pay. He received the actual decoration of CB from King Edward VII during an investiture at Buckingham Palace on 24 October 1902.

In early October 1902 he was placed under orders to go to India, where he was to take up command of the Wellington (Southern) district in Madras. Later, he was appointed to command the 1st Brigade of the Secunderabad Division in India, promoted to major-general in 1906 and relinquishing command in 1907.

On 20 June 1908 he succeeded Major General James Trotter as commander of the British forces in Sierra Leone, which he held until 1911, and then Lieutenant Governor of Guernsey—and correspondingly commander of the forces in Guernesy and Alderney—from 1911 to his retirement in April 1914.

Shortly after his retirement, following the outbreak of the First World War, he was brought back to serve as the first commander of the newly raised 20th (Light) Division in the New Armies on 15 September 1914. He held the command less than a month before handing over to Richard Hutton Davies, a New Zealand officer who had been invalided home from the Western Front. His final military position was a purely ceremonial one; from 1914 to 1920 he was colonel-in-chief of the Queen's Royal Regiment.

== Notes ==
Government offices
Preceded by Robert Auld	Lieutenant Governor of Guernsey; 1911–1914	Succeeded by Sir Henry Lawson
Military offices
Preceded by New post	GOC 20th (Light) Division; 1914	Succeeded by Richard Davies
Honorary titles
Preceded by Thomas Kelly-Kenny	Colonel of the Queen's Royal Regiment (West Surrey); 1914–1920	Succeeded by Sir Charles Monro
