= Albert Edward Shepherd =

English recipient of the Victoria Cross

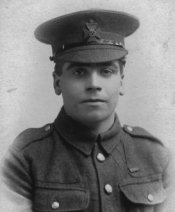
- Born: 11 January 1897; Royston, Yorkshire
- Died: 23 October 1966 (aged 69); Royston
- Burial place: Royston Cemetery
- Military career
- Allegiance: United Kingdom
- Branch: British Army
- Service years: 1915 - 1919
- Rank: Corporal
- Units: King's Royal Rifle Corps
- Conflicts: World War I
- Awards: Victoria Cross

Albert Edward Shepherd VC (11 January 1897 – 23 October 1966) was an English recipient of the Victoria Cross, the highest and most prestigious award for gallantry in the face of the enemy that can be awarded to British and Commonwealth forces.

He was 20 years old, and a Rifleman in the 12th (S) Battalion, King's Royal Rifle Corps, British Army during the First World War when he performed deeds at Villers Plouich, France on 20 November 1917 for which he was awarded the VC.

== The Citation ==
The citation reads:

No. R/15089 Rflmn. Albert Edward Shepherd, K.R.R.C. (Barnsley).

For most conspicuous bravery as a company runner.

When his company was held up by a machine gun at point blank range he volunteered to rush the gun, and, though ordered not to, rushed forward and threw a Mills bomb, killing two gunners and capturing the gun. The company, on continuing its advance, came under heavy enfilade machine gun fire.
When the last officer and the last non-commissioned officer had become casualties, he took command of the company, ordered the men to lie down, and himself went back some seventy yards under severe fire to obtain the help of a tank.
He then returned to his company, and finally led them to their last objective.

He showed throughout conspicuous determination and resource.

He was appointed lance corporal on 28 August 1916 and became acting corporal one month later on 28 September 1916. Shepherd was awarded the French Croix de Guerre. In March 1920, the award of the French Médaille militaire was announced but a correction in January 1921 substituted the French Croix de Guerre.

== The Medal ==
His Victoria Cross medal group is displayed at the Royal Green Jackets (Rifles) Museum, Winchester, England.

== Bibliography ==
- Gliddon, Gerald (2004) [2012]. VCs of the First World War: Cambrai 1917. The History Press. ISBN 978-0-75-247668-1.
- Whitworth, Alan (2012). Yorkshire VCs. Barnsley: Pen & Sword. ISBN 978-1-84884-778-1.
