= Liverpool Press Guard =

Liverpool Press Guard 9th Battalion, King's (Liverpool Regiment)
- Active: 10 January 1861 – 21 June 1919
- Country: United Kingdom
- Branch: Volunteer Force/Territorial Force
- Role: Infantry
- Size: 1–3 Battalions
- Part of: King's (Liverpool Regiment); 55th (West Lancashire) Division; 57th (2nd West Lancashire) Division
- Garrison/HQ: Everton Road drill hall
- Anniversaries: 13 March (arrival in France)
- Engagements: Second Boer War; World War I: Battle of Aubers Ridge; Battle of Loos; Battle of the Somme; Third Battle of Ypres; Battle of Cambrai; Second Battles of Arras; Battles of the Hindenburg Line; Liberation of Lille

Commanders
- Notable commanders: Lt-Col George McCorquodale; Maj-Gen Frank Ramsay

The Liverpool Press Guard was a Rifle Volunteer Corps raised in the city of Liverpool in Lancashire, North West England, in 1861. Initially drawn from the newspaper and printing trades, it later recruited more widely in the Everton and Ormskirk areas. In 1881 it became a battalion of the King's (Liverpool Regiment). A detachment served in the Second Boer War, and two battalions saw action during World War I distinguishing themselves at the Battle of Loos, on the Somme, at Ypres and at Cambrai. It fought in the Battles of the Hindenburg Line in 1918 and was the first unit to liberate Lille in October 1918. The battalion was amalgamated into the Royal Engineers after the war.

== Volunteer Force ==
The Liverpool Press Guard was formed in Liverpool on 10 January 1861 from employees of the newspaper and printing trades in the city, (Note: Particularly from the Albion, Liverpool Mercury and Weekly Chronicle newspapers.) who were sworn in at St George's Hall. It was assigned the designation 80th Lancashire RVC, and the Liverpool Press Guard subtitle was officially added the following year. Initially of five companies, three more being added on 19 January, the unit was commanded by Lieutenant-Colonel George McCorquodale, a successful printer from Newton-le-Willows. Many of the men from his printing works had already enrolled in the 73rd Lancashire RVC in that town, which was absorbed into the 80th as No 9 Company on 31 March 1863. Early parades of the unit took place at Rose Hill Police Station and at the Corn Exchange in Brunswick Street until headquarters (HQ) was established at 16 Soho Street.

McCorquodale retired from the command on 3 October 1868, becoming the unit's first Honorary Colonel, and was succeeded as commanding officer (CO) by Lt-Col Charles Hamilton. The Honorary Chaplain was the Very Rev John Howson, Dean of Chester. (Note: Howson had previously held the same position with the 1st Lancashire RVC.) The battalion later extended its recruiting to include other tradesmen and artisans in the Everton area of the city, and farm workers from nearby Ormskirk. The Volunteers were generally popular in the community. Volunteers in uniform were exempt from paying tolls, but in 1873 officials of the Woodside Ferry refused men of the Press Guard, and a fight ensued.

=== Cardwell Reforms ===
Under the 'Localisation of the Forces' scheme introduced by the Cardwell Reforms of 1872, volunteer battalions were brigaded with their local regular and militia battalions. Sub-District No 13 (County of Lancashire) was formed in Northern District with headquarters at Liverpool and the following units assigned:

- 8th (The King's) Regiment of Foot (2 battalions)
- 2nd Royal Lancashire Militia (The Duke of Lancaster's Own Rifles) (2 battalions)
- 1st Lancashire RVC
- 5th (Liverpool Volunteer Rifle Brigade) Lancashire RVC
- 64th (Liverpool Irish) Lancashire RVC
- 80th (Liverpool Press Guard) Lancashire RVC

The smaller RVCs were consolidated into larger battalions in 1880; the 80th Lancashire RVC was already battalion-sized and did not need to amalgamate, but was renumbered as the 19th (Liverpool Press Guard) Lancashire RVC on 3 September.

The Childers Reforms of 1881 took Cardwell's reforms further, the regular regiments dropping their numbers and adopting territorial titles, with the militia and volunteers formally affiliated to them. The 19th Lancashire RVC became a volunteer battalion of the 8th Foot (redesignated the King's (Liverpool Regiment)) on 1 July 1881 and formally became the 6th Volunteer Battalion of that regiment from 1 April 1888.

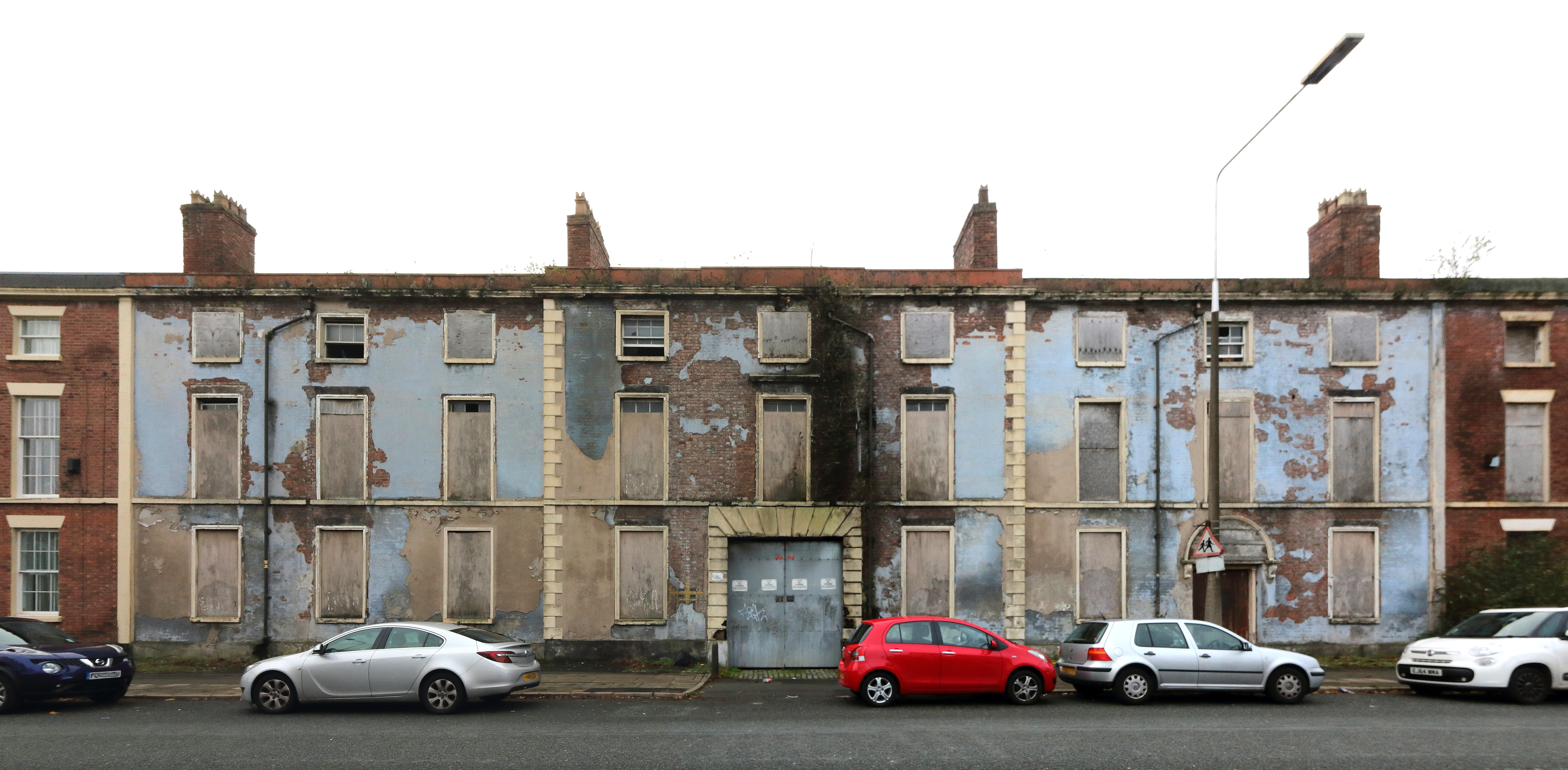
The former Everton Road Drill Hall, in three converted houses dating from 1830.

Lieutenant-Col C.A. Whitney took over as CO on 8 February 1882. In 1884 Battalion HQ left Soho Street for a larger and better equipped Drill Hall at 57–61 Everton Road. From 1884 the Isle of Man Volunteers were attached to the 19th Lancashire RVC for administrative purposes. This unit was formally redesignated as 7th (Isle of Man) Volunteer Battalion, King's (Liverpool Regiment) on 1 March 1888, although it was only one company strong.

While the sub-districts were referred to as 'brigades', they were purely administrative organisations and the volunteers were excluded from the 'mobilisation' part of the Cardwell system. The Stanhope Memorandum of December 1888 proposed a more comprehensive Mobilisation Scheme for volunteer units, which would assemble in their own brigades at key points in case of war. In peacetime these brigades provided a structure for collective training. Under this scheme the Volunteer Battalions of the King's (Liverpool Regiment), together with VBs from other regiments based in Lancashire and Cheshire, formed a large and unwieldy Mersey Brigade. By 1900 the brigade consisted only of the eight VBs of the King's. Lieutenant-Col Alfred I. Watts was promoted to CO of the 6th VB on 18 January 1899.

=== Second Boer War ===
After Black Week in December 1899, the volunteers were invited to send active service units to assist the regulars in the Second Boer War. In January 1900 the War Office decided that one 114-strong Volunteer Service Company (VSC) could be recruited from the volunteer battalions of any infantry regiment that had a regular battalion serving in South Africa. The 6th VB, King's, accordingly raised a service company that included an Isle of Man detachment. The VSC gained the 6th and 7th VBs the Battle honour South Africa 1900–01, and these men's experience of active service proved valuable at postwar training camps.

After the Boer War the Volunteer Infantry Brigades were reduced to a more manageable four or five battalions each, and in 1902 some VBs of the King's (Liverpool Regiment), including the 6th, transferred from the Mersey Brigade (renamed the Liverpool Brigade) to a new South Lancashire Brigade alongside VBs of the South Lancashire Regiment.

The 6th VB added a Cyclist company in 1902, but one of the battalion's companies was disbanded in 1907.

== Territorial Force ==
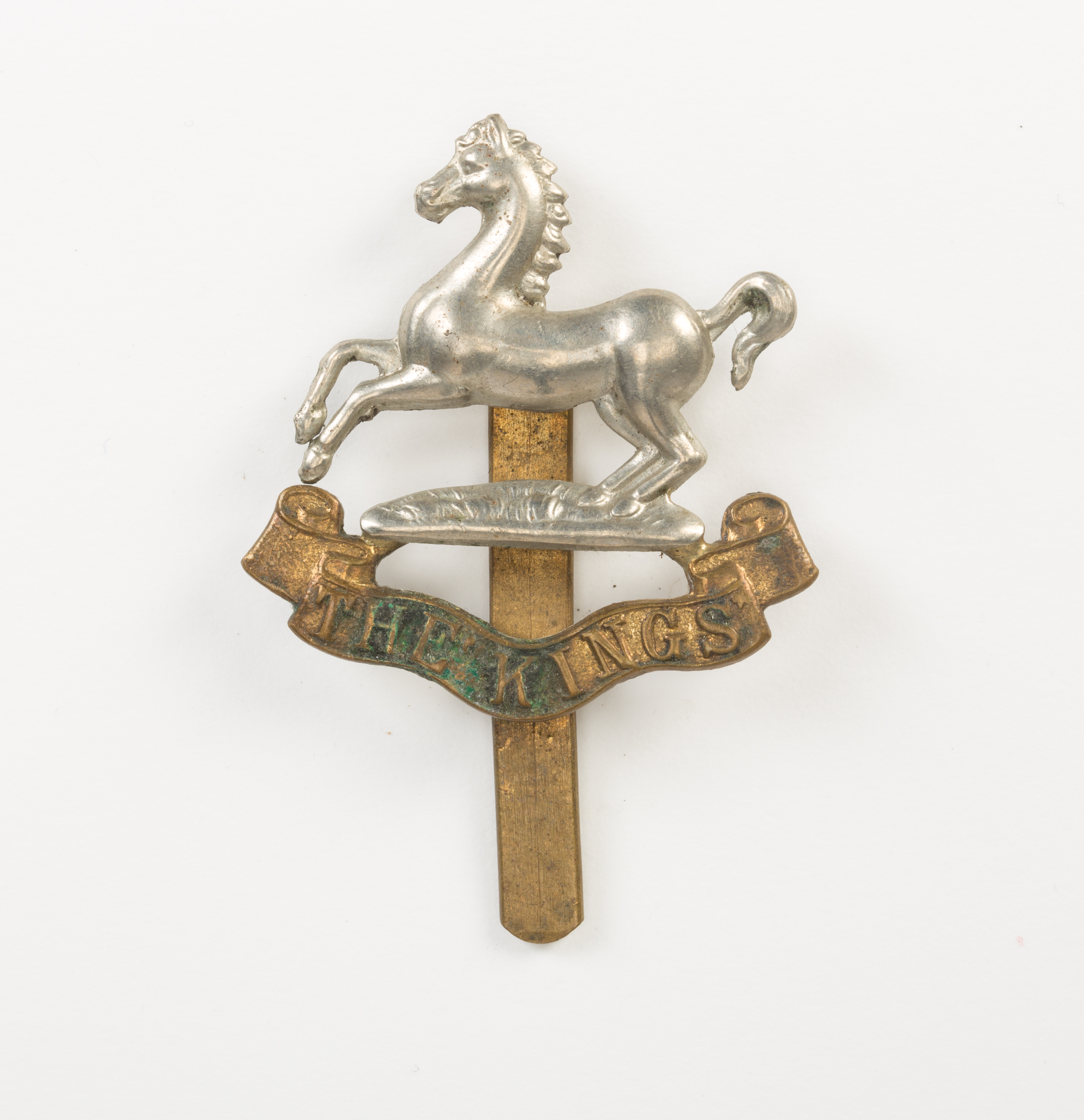
Cap badge of the King's (Liverpool Regiment) from 1908.

When the Volunteers were subsumed into the new Territorial Force (TF) under the Haldane Reforms of 1908, the 6th VB became 9th Battalion, King's (Liverpool Regiment) on 1 April. The battalion was organised as on eight-company establishment, all based at Everton Road.The battalion continued in the South Lancashire Brigade of the TF's West Lancashire Division.

== World War I ==
=== Mobilisation ===
At the outbreak of World War I the West Lancashire Division had just begun its annual training and when mobilisation was ordered on 4 August 1914 the units were sent back to their drill halls. The 9th King's mobilised at Everton Road under the command of Lt-Col Luther Watts, VD, CO since 4 February 1911. On the first night the men were accommodated at the Hippodrome Theatre, where additional performances were laid on for them. Afterwards they were billeted at Liverpool College and fed at the Newsboys' Home in Everton Road. A variety of horsedrawn civilian vehicles were pressed into service for the regimental transport; twice these were taken away for other units and had to be replaced by further impressment. On 13 August that battalion entrained for Edinburgh to go to the South Lancashire Bde's war station in the Forth Defences. The battalion was housed in tents and later billeted in Dunfermline. Blankets for the men were donated by local people, and the Hon Colonel, William Hall Walker, gave money for extra clothing and other comforts.

The TF was intended to be a home defence force for service during wartime and members could not be compelled to serve outside the country. However, on 10 August 1914 TF units were invited to volunteer for overseas service and the majority did so. On 15 August, the War Office issued instructions to separate those men who had signed up for Home Service only, and form these into reserve units. On 31 August, the formation of a reserve or 2nd Line unit was authorised for each 1st Line unit where 60 per cent or more of the men had volunteered for Overseas Service. The titles of these 2nd Line units would be the same as the original, but distinguished by a '2/' prefix. In this way duplicate battalions, brigades and divisions were created, mirroring those TF formations being sent overseas. Later the 2nd Line was prepared for overseas service and 3rd Line units were formed to train reinforcements.

=== 1/9th King's ===
In October 1914 the South Lancashire Bde moved to Tunbridge Wells, to join the West Lancashire Division, which was concentrating in Kent. Here the battalion reorganised on the standard four-company establishment and carried out route marching and field practice, with musketry training at Sandwich. The men also worked on digging defences for the coastline and London, and posted guards on vulnerable points. The regimental historian relates that little if any assistance was given by higher formations. Indeed, as its units achieved a good level of efficiency the West Lancashire Division was progressively broken up to reinforce the British Expeditionary Force fighting on the Western Front. One of the units to leave was the 1/9th King's, which embarked at Southampton Docks and landed at Le Havre on 13 March 1915 to join 2nd Brigade in 1st Division. It was commanded by Lt-Col J.E. Lloyd, VD, who had been promoted to command the 1/9th King's in December when Lt-Col Luther Watts was posted to the 2/9th Bn at Blackpool.

==== Aubers Ridge ====
The battalion's companies went into the line in turn at 'Port Arthur' near Neuve-Chapelle to be instructed in Trench warfare by the regular battalions, and suffered their first casualties. Lieutenant-Col Lloyd was invalided home in April and Major T.J. Bolland took temporary command. The battalion took over its own section of the line at Richebourg-St-Vaast, where it was subjected to a heavy artillery bombardment on 1 May. 1/9th King's first action was 1st Division's attack at Rue du Bois at the Battle of Aubers Ridge on 9 May. The battalion was in the third (reserve) line for 2nd Bde's attack, but was called forward and passed over the support line to reach the front line. Here they simply contributed to the confusion following the failure of the initial attack, with the trenches providing inadequate shelter and under heavy fire. Major Bolland was killed, and Maj J.W.B. Hunt, who took over command, decided that there was no question of renewing the attack without further artillery preparation: the enemy barbed wire was virtually intact and the only two gaps were covered by enemy machine gun fire. The battalion was ordered to make a fresh attack at 11.15, but this was repeatedly postponed and then cancelled. 1/9th King's was withdrawn at 16.00, having suffered around 100 casualties, though these were insignificant compared to the attacking battalions of the brigade. Major Frank Ramsay, a regular officer from the Middlesex Regiment, was posted to command the battalion.

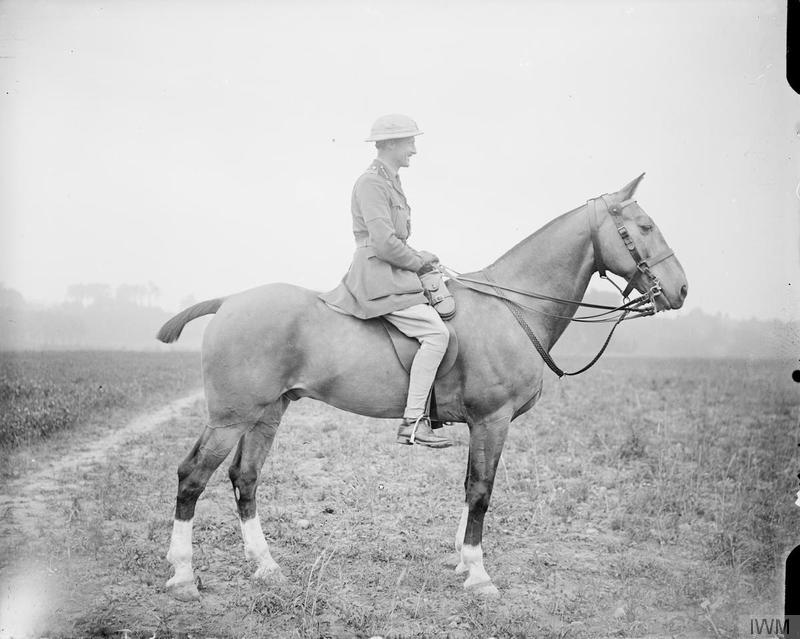
Frank Ramsay, who commanded 1/9th King's, 1915–16, pictured as a Brigadier-General in 1917.

1/9th King's returned to the front line on 20 May and spent the following weeks in the dangerous area of the Cuinchy brickstacks, where the trenches were so waterlogged that the men cut down their trousers as improvised shorts. The battalion was relieved on 7 July and after spending two weeks in brigade and division reserve it went back into the line at Vermelles, in front of the Hohenzollern Redoubt. In late August the whole battalion went out into No man's land each night to dig jumping-off trenches for the forthcoming offensive in this sector (the Battle of Loos).

==== Loos ====
1/9th King's spent the first three weeks of September behind the lines at Burbure rehearsing the attack they were to make at Loos. The battalion matched back by stages and entered the line on 24 September. The attack was launched next morning. 1/9th King's, together with 1/14th Londons (London Scottish) of 1st Brigade, formed 'Green's Force', tasked with advancing into the gap as their two brigades diverged in the attack. The battalion was held back until 08.00, but then it immediately came under fire as it advanced from its assembly trench up to the front line. One of the battalion machine guns was pushed forwards, and under its covering fire the advance began at 14.00, led by Lr-Col Ramsay in person. Progress was slow and casualties were heavy – the sections advanced by short rushes to minimise them – but by 15.30 the battalion had established itself close to the German trenches. Outflanked by another British battalion, the defenders in front of 1/9th King's surrendered. After 3–400 prisoners had been sent to the rear, the battalion continued on to establish a line on the Lens–Hulluch road. The battalion had suffered 235 casualties during the day. Early next day it was withdrawn into reserve, then moved back to Mazingarbe on 28 September. After a further short spell in the line at the Slag Heap, with billets in the ruined houses of Loos, the battalion was withdrawn to rest and reorganise.

On 7 October the battalion returned to the front line along the Lens–Hulluch road. The trench was no more than a shallow roadside ditch, and before the men were able to deepen it they were subjected to an intense artillery bombardment next day lasting from 10.30 to 16.30, followed by a German infantry attack from Bois Hugo. Despite their casualties and the devastation to their line, the battalion held off the attack with rifle fire and enfilade fire from their two machine guns, the Germans being stopped 40 yards (37 m) from the line. The exhausted battalion was immediately relieved. It was in support when the 1st Division carried out an attack on the Hohenzollern Redoubt on 13 October but was not engaged, though it received heavy retaliatory shellfire.

The divisional insignia of 55th (West Lancashire) Division, the Red Rose of Lancaster.

On 12 November 1/9th King's transferred within 1st Division to 3rd Brigade, where one of the regular battalions was too weak for trench duty, but it left 1st Division on 7 January 1916 and entrained for Hocquincourt to rejoin the West Lancashire Division, which was being reformed as 55th (West Lancashire) Division. 1/9th King's joined 165th (Liverpool) Brigade and from January 1916 was billeted in Mérélessart. At the end of the month Lt-Col Ramsay left on his promotion to Brigadier-General, and Maj C.P.James assumed temporary command.

==== Somme ====
In early February the division was ordered to the Somme sector and 1/9th King's marched by stages through winter weather to Wailly, where it took over trenches from French troops and began putting them into order. Major C.G. Bradley took over the command on 29 February. Over the following months the battalion carried out several tours of duty in the Wailly trenches, interspersed with periods in the rear where it had to find working parties. Although the sector was quiet, that summer's 'Big Push' (the Battle of the Somme) was being prepared to the south. On 28 June a party from 1/9th King's took part in a diversionary raid; in retaliation the Germans brought up heavy artillery and flattened the battalion's front trenches, inflicting heavy casualties on D Company. On 8 July the battalion was withdrawn to divisional reserve, where it began intensive training in attack techniques. Then on 20 July it began to move south to join in the offensive, arriving in 'Happy Valley' on 29 July and bivouacking near Fricourt. On the afternoon of 4 August it took over the front line near Arrow Head Copse in front of Guillemont.

Preparations for the next phase of the offensive (the Battle of Guillemont) were hampered by enemy shellfire, and 1/9th King's suffered a steady trickle of casualties. On the nights of 10/11 and 11/12 August the companies moved into position to support the neighbouring French units in their attack on 12 August. The bombardment began at 15.30 and zero hour was fixed for 17.15. The battalion bombers of 1/9th King's worked their way down a trench known as 'Cochrane Alley' while two companies advanced in waves down the left and the French attacked into the Maurepas ravine on its right. The attack ran into heavy machine gun fire, the French attackers disappeared into the ravine and never returned, and the right hand company of 1/9th King's was stopped despite the leadership of the company commander and company sergeant-major, both of whom were killed. The bombers were shot down as they emerged from the end of Cochrane Alley. With failure of the French there was nothing to be done and the attackers were withdrawn after dark, apart from a forward block in Cochrane Alley. Next day the battalion was relieved and withdrew to rest on the coast, though the men were trained hard. The CO was evacuated and Maj P.G.A. Lederer (who had begun the war as a Second lieutenant in the battalion) took temporary command.

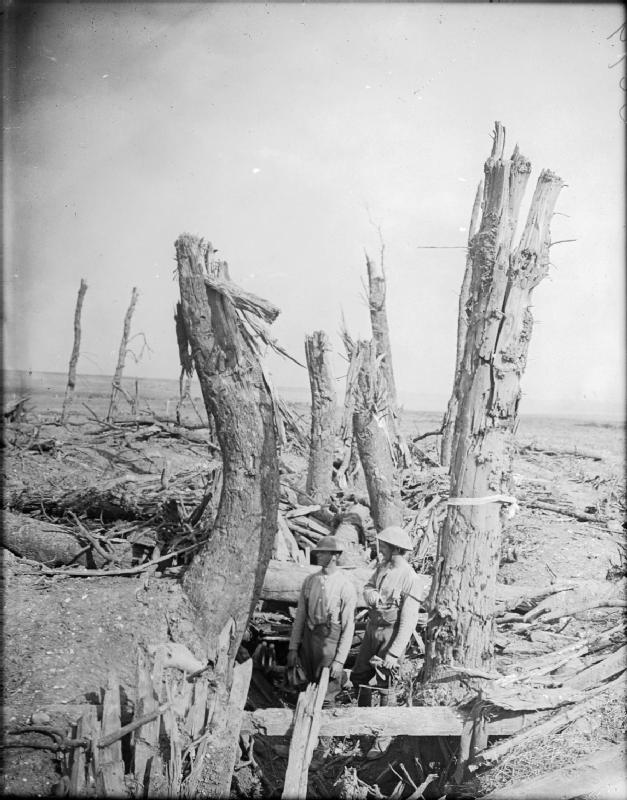
British soldiers in wrecked German trench at Ginchy, 1916.

The battalion returned to the Somme sector on 4 September, Maj H.K.S. Woodhouse arriving from the 5th King's to take command. On the night of 4/5 September 165th Bde relieved a brigade of 24th Division that had been fighting to take 'Tea Tree Trench'. The other battalions bombed their way forward and established forward posts, then early in the morning of 8 September 1/9th and 1/5th King's pushed forwards and joined hands in Tea Tree Trench without opposition. They found the trench so knocked about by shellfire that it had to be re-dug. Patrols went forward several hundred yards up the Flers road without finding any Germans, but consolidation of the captured position was hindered by enemy snipers and shellfire while the Battle of Ginchy raged nearby.

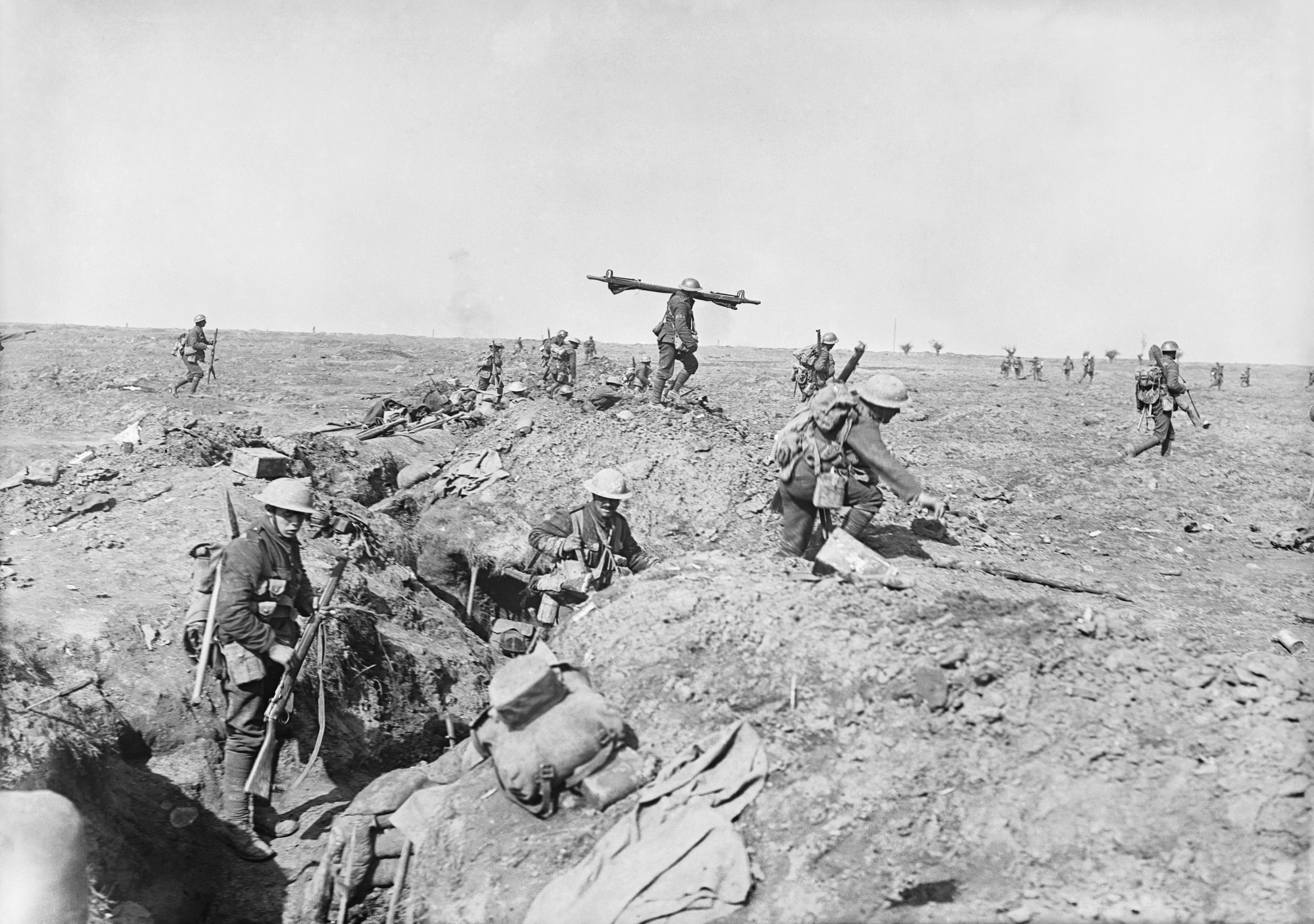
British infantry at Morval, 25 September 1916.

Between 10 and 13 September 55th (WL) Division went back to a rest camp until 17 September, when 1/9th King's returned to the line at Flers where the BEF had launched a new attack (the Battle of Flers–Courcelette). The battalion was under heavy shellfire for two days before returning to the waggon lines at Pommier Redoubt. On 23 September it paraded and moved up to Flers for the next attack (the Battle of Morval). As the fittest brigade in the division, 165th Bde led off. 1/9th King's was to advance 1,000 yards (910 m) and capture the objective from 'Seven Dials' to 'Factory Corner' near Gueudecourt; zero hour was 12.35 on 25 September. According to the Official History 'the 1/7th, 1/6th and 1/9th King's went forward in splendid style, keeping close to the barrage' (this was the first time the men had followed a creeping barrage). 1/9th King's advanced in four waves at 100 yards (91 m) intervals, the last wave suffering heavy casualties as it was caught by the German defensive barrage, and advanced HQ was also badly hit while in a crowded trench. However, the three battalions secured their first objective soon after 13.00, 1/9th on the left clearing 'Grove Alley' with bomb and bayonet. 1/5th King's then came forward through the line to take the sunken road between Gueudecourt and the 'Gird' trenches. Next day 1/8th King's took the Gird trenches with little loss against a demoralised enemy.

==== Ypres ====
After this considerable success 55th (WL) Division was withdrawn from the fighting, its battalions much reduced: 1/9th King's had suffered 650 casualties during the Battle of the Somme, including 15 officers killed. But instead of going for rest and reorganisation it was immediately sent to hold the line in the Ypres Salient, detraining at Ypres on 4 October. However, apart from the ever-present danger of gas attacks, the usually dangerous Salient was quiet at this time, most of the German artillery having been moved to the Somme. Up to January 1917, 1/9th King's did four tours of duty in the line, and provided continuous working parties behind the lines. The division was then withdrawn for a long period of training at Proven. It returned to duty at Ypres on 24 February, where Lt-Col F.W.M. Drew from the South Lancashire Regiment took over command from Lt-Col Woodhouse. From its positions in the Potijze sector, the battalion carried out a raid on an enemy post opposite No 5 Crater on 4 March, taking some prisoners, but the enemy retaliated on 19 March, taking about 10 men of the battalion prisoner. In April the 1/9th King's took its turn in reserve, but two companies had to remain in Ypres at all times to provide working parties. In late April it returned to the line in the Railway Wood sector, and then did another tour at Potijze, where it carried out an effective raid on 11 May. After a month's training at Bollezeele, the battalion returned to Potijze on 11 June. The BEF was preparing for its Flanders Offensive (the Third Battle of Ypres) and enemy shellfire had greatly increased. Numerous casualties were suffered by the battalion while constructing 'Hopkins Trench' in No man's land. At the beginning of July it was withdrawn to begin training for the forthcoming offensive.

'Z Day' for the opening attack (the Battle of Pilckem Ridge) was 31 July; the battalion took up its positions in 'Oxford Trench' during the night, under shellfire. The assigned objective for 1/9th King's was a section of the German second (' Stuzpunkt ') line, from 'Pommern Redoubt' (' Gartenhof ' to the Germans) to 'Bank Farm' (' Blucher '), the distance to be covered being about 1.5 miles (2.4 km), a long advance by the standards of 1917. Zero hour was 03.50, when the battalion went over the top and advanced up to the British front line, where as planned it waited for 25 minutes. It then went forwards, but the planned advance in waves proved impossible over the shell-churned ground, and all cohesion was lost. In groups the men crossed the German front line, but came under machine gun fire. They reached the Steenbeek stream, with a strong German position ('Bank Farm') on the other side of the valley. The depleted companies made a final rush into the German strongpoints, including Pommern Redoubt, though parties of Germans held out in parts of them for several hours. Bank Farm held out until a British tank arrived. 164th (North Lancashire) Brigade passed through to continue the attack in the afternoon, but had to retire at nightfall, and 165th Bde was left to consolidate a frontline position in the Stuzpunkt line, which was churned up into a morass of muddy shellholes. A German counter-attack was anticipated on 2 August and 1/9th King's sent up every available man from the transport lines. These reinforcements suffered casualties on the way up, and many rifles in the line were unserviceable due to mud, but the handful of defenders were spared the counter-attack when it was dispersed by British shellfire. Casualty evacuation was slow and difficult in the muddy conditions: they were collected at Bank Farm, but it was a long time before they could be moved back to the Aid Post at 'Plum Farm'. The battalion was relieved on the night of 2/3 August and moved down in small parties to Potijze. They were shelled out of the village and told to rendezvous at Vlamertinge, where they boarded motor buses for Watou. On 6 August they went by train to Audruicq and were billeted in the nearby hamlet of Blanc Pignon, where 1/9th King's spent six weeks recuperating. The capture of Pommern Redoubt was specially commented on in Sir Douglas Haig's dispatch on the battle.

Reinforcements arrived slowly and piecemeal, and 55th (WL) Division was still weak when it returned to Ypres on 14 September. On 18 September 1/9th King's moved back into the shell crater positions at Bank Farm that it had captured on 31 July, which had not been advanced despite two more major attacks in the intervening weeks. The enemy were expecting a new attack, and shelled the positions early on 19 September. The Battle of the Menin Road Ridge opened on 20 September. The objectives for 1/9th King's were Hill 35 and 'Gallipoli Farm', a commanding strongpoint on rising ground some 400–500 yards (370–460 m) in front. Zero was at 05.40, but there was heavy enemy shellfire just before and the German machine gunners inflicted many casualties as the battalion advanced behind the barrage in four successive company waves. For some time the Germans defended a derelict tank as a pillbox on Hill 35, but the rest of the leading wave reached Gallipoli Farm. It took hand-to-hand fighting with bayonet and bomb to capture it (some of the enemy being in dugouts that the leading waves had not cleared). Some captured German machine guns were then turned upon them. Towards 17.30 the Germans brought down a heavy bombardment on the positions, but their counter-attack was driven off by shell, machine gun and rifle fire. Despite 165th Bde's difficulties, the attack had been overall been a resounding success. The Germans made one more counter-attack towards 'Somme Farm' at 18.00 on 21 September, and there was concern at Battalion HQ when contact was lost with the forward companies. However, the second-in-command got through to Somme Farm and came back to report that the front line was holding with the help of the defensive barrage. The battalion was relieved on 22 September and made its way back via Vlamertinge to Watou.

==== Cambrai ====
At the end of September the division entrained to join Third Army in the south. In early October it moved into the forward positions in front of Lempire. The front was not held as a continuous line but as a series of posts. 1/9th King's did a tour of duty in 'Cat', 'Fleeceall' and 'Grafton' posts, and then another in the Ossus sector. When the Battle of Cambrai opened on 20 November, the battalion's only duty was to operate a dummy tank and dummy infantry in front of 'The Birdcage' to divert German attention from the main attack. On 22 November the battalion went into reserve, but it returned by 29 November, when a German counter-offensive was expected. On the morning of 30 November 1/9th King's were in some dugouts at Lempire supporting 165th Bde in the front line. The battalion 'stood to' well before dawn, and there was a heavy German bombardment to the north, including gas shells, but the battalion anticipated a normal day. Then news arrived that the Germans had broken through near the Birdcage, and that Lempire had to be held at all costs. In full view of the enemy and subjected to shelling and air attack, 1/9th King's quickly dug a new trench running east–west on the high ground to the north to cover Lempire and Épehy, fortunately with few casualties. The rest of 165th Bde fought on in isolated groups and suffered severely. 1/9th King's sent one company to form a flank guard and another to support 1/6th King's at 'Cruciform Post'. On 2 December the battalion took over from 1/6th King's with the task of putting the line from 'Heythrop Post', through Cruciform Post to Priel Bank into a state of defence. These posts were isolated, and were dangerous to approach during daylight; a post at Cazalet Copse was very close to the enemy, and even Battalion HQ was under rifle fire in the front line. The battalion was relieved on 5 December and went by motor lorry to billets in Péronne. A long and tedious railway journey on 10 December took 55th (WL) Division to join First Army in the north. On 14 December it went into billets at Lisbourg, where it was rested for the next six weeks.

==== Reorganisation ====
The divisional insignia of 57th (2nd West Lancashire) Division.

The BEF was now suffering a serious manpower crisis, and infantry brigades were reduced from four to three battalions each. As the junior battalion in 165th Bde, the 1/9th King's was broken up on 31 January 1918, with men being drafted to the 1st, 4th and 12th battalions of the regiment. The remaining officers and men were sent to Armentières to join the 2/9th King's in 172nd (2/1st South Lancashire) Brigade of 57th (2nd West Lancashire) Division (see below). From now on the combined battalion was referred to simply as '9th King's' once more, commanded by Lt-Col Drew.

When the German spring offensive was launched against Fifth and Third Armies on 21 March, 57th (2nd WL) Division was in the Fleurbaix area, but First Army soon began sending reinforcements to the threatened sector. By 1 April the 57th was the only fresh division left in reserve for the BEF and on that day it began moving south by train and route march. By the time 9th King's left Sombrin on the afternoon of 13 April it had no idea where it was headed, but bivouacked in Beaucamp Ravine. Two days later it was moved to Hénu where it pitched camp and remained for two weeks, erecting rear lines of defence and awaiting orders as the fighting shifted from one sector of the front to another. Finally, in the first week in May, 172nd Bde took over the front line at Gommecourt, with 9th King's in Gommecourt Park in close support, occupying the former German front line of 1916. The battalions then began a routine of tours of duty in the trenches and patrolling No man's land, under occasional shelling and sniper fire. On 24 May Lt-Col Drew was evacuated sick and Maj S.C. Ball took temporary command. Early in July the battalion came out of the line and went to Authie, where Lt-Col Lord Henry Seymour, DSO, of the Grenadier Guards, arrived to take command. On 29 July the battalion left Authie and marched to Arras. After some days of training it took over the outpost line in the Gavrelle–Fampoux sector, overlooking the German positions.

==== Hundred Days Offensive ====
The Allies launched their Hundred Days Offensive at the Battle of Amiens on 8 August. At Arras, 9th King's was relieved from the line on 17 August and went to rest, but was unexpectedly called out on 21 August and in a series of night marches returned to the front. In fighting order it took over trenches facing the Hindenburg Line on 27 August. Next morning it received orders to attack at 12.30 (chosen as it was the German mealtime), launching the Battle of the Scarpe. 172nd Brigade was to lead the advance of 57th (2nd WL) Division. The two leading companies of 9th King's assembled in 'Humber Redoubt' and 'Mole Lane' with the other two companies in the rear. Its first objective was 'Hoop Lane' and the second was the village of Riencourt. The brigade advanced behind a barrage fired by six brigades (288 guns) of field artillery while two brigades of heavy artillery shelled the objective. Despite this support the Germans put up considerable resistance in 'Copse Trench' and 'Fag Alley' but were overcome by 9th King's and 2/4th South Lancashires who pushed on to the first objective. Parties of both battalions then penetrated into Hendecourt, where they found some men of the neighbouring 56th (1st London) Division who had gone astray. They later withdrew with the Londoners to the first objective, which had been decided as the limit to the advance that day. Here 9th King's reorganised while 170th (2/1st North Lancashire) Brigade completed the capture of Hendecourt next day. Lord Henry Seymour had been wounded during the action and the command devolved upon Maj Ball once more. After their casualties during the attack A and C Companies formed a composite X Company, and B and D formed Y Company. The battalion was ready for action again within 24 hours.

9th King's was ordered to attack again on 2 September (the Battle of the Drocourt-Quéant Line). Marching up to its jumping-off line at Hendecourt the Intelligence Section, which had been guiding it through the broken trenches in the dark, was wiped out by a shell, and the battalion only reached its position 15 minutes before Zero, which was set for 05.00. After the Canadian Corps had broken into the Drocourt-Quéant position, 172nd Bde's task was to advance down the line behind a barrage and roll it up. 9th King's sent forward one company over the open behind the barrage to take Riencourt. Later both companies followed the rest of the brigade and sent forward patrols. After this success 9th King's was withdrawn to bivouacs at Croisilles on 3 September, where it reorganised into four companies once more. On 7 September the battalion went into reserve, and then from 11 to 16 September it supplied two companies to man the new line at Inchy. Although the forward outposts were in waterlogged shellholes, battalion and company HQs were in deep dugouts of the Hindenburg Line.

For the next phase of the offensive, 57th (2nd WL) Division was transferred to Third Army. On 25 September 9th King's was moved by train and route march to Lagnicourt. On 27 September, as part of the Battle of the Canal du Nord, it assembled in the old Hindenburg Line and moved through Mœuvres before crossing the canal and advancing in open order towards the southern corner of Bourlon Wood. Crossing the crest, just north of Anneux, A Company suffered casualties from a German field gun. There was confusion over the position of the attacking troops in front, and it was not until 18.00 that 172nd Bde resumed its advance, repelling a counter-attack between Anneux and Graincourt, and then pushing on about 1,000 yards (910 m) beyond Graincourt, still short of its final objective. After reorganising, a new attempt was made on 30 September, but the suburb of Proville outside Cambrai was still in enemy hands and machine gun fire from the houses prevented 9th King's from advancing.

The battalion was withdrawn to La Folie Wood, where it tried to rest in captured German shelters, under persistent shelling. On 5 October it took over the outpost zone at Proville. Because of fire from German artillery and Minenwerfers, this bridgehead across the Canal de L'Escaut was only lightly held. 57th (2nd WL) Division was withdrawn after Cambrai fell to the British on 9 October: the battalion left for the Cantaing area. It later entrained for Béthune when the division was transferred to Fifth Army, which was pursuing the Germans. It had pushed in the defences of the city of Lille but the situation was fluid and confused: 172nd and 171st (2/1st Liverpool) Brigades of 57th (2nd WL) Division were ordered to pass through the British lines and occupy the city on 17 October. 9th King's paraded in battle order, and then advanced cautiously, wary of booby-traps. It entered the suburbs behind advanced patrols, and reached the canal to the west of the city about 17.00. All the bridges had been blown up, but one was still passable to infantry in single file. D Company went across first and were greeted by hundreds of French civilians celebrating their liberation. The Germans had left, and for the next three days the battalion was engaged in re-establishing administration in the city, and provided the guard of honour when it was visited by the Prime Minister of France, Georges Clemenceau. On 24 October 9th King's moved forward again, taking over the outpost line at Froyennes, near Tournai. There were no longer any defined front lines, and the positions consisted of sentry and lookout positions amongst the houses, where French civilians were still living, despite German shelling.

On 1 November 57th (2nd WL) Division handed over its sector of the front line on the west bank of the Schelde, north of Tournai, and went into billets in the eastern suburbs of Lille, with 9th King's at Hellemmes. The division was still resting when the Armistice with Germany ended hostilities.

9th King's was withdrawn to Lille, where it resumed training. During the month the battalion was commanded first by Lt-Col Dawson, then by Lt-Col M.E. Makgill-Crichton-Maitland of the Grenadier Guards, who had been acting commander of 172nd Bde. On 21 November 57th (2nd WL) Division was ordered to Arras, where it was engaged in battlefield salvage. Demobilisation began in January 1919 and accelerated during February until by 23 March all the division's units had been reduced to cadre strength. A large number of men from 9th King's who were not yet eligible for demobilisation went as reinforcements to units in Egypt. The cadre returned to Liverpool, where it was welcomed at St George's Hall and then demobilised on 21 June 1919.

=== 2/9th King's ===
The 2nd Line battalion was formed in October/November 1914 at Liverpool, and moved to Blackpool in November, where Lt-Col Lt-Col Luther Watts took command in December. It moved to Ashford, Kent, in February 1915 to replace 1/9th King's in the West Lancashire Division (the join 1st and 2nd Line brigades and divisions were effectively amalgamated until 2/1st South Lancashire Brigade and 2nd West Lancashire Division received their numbers as 172nd Bde and 57th Division) in August 1915.

Until November 1915 the infantry only had obsolete .256-in Japanese Ariska rifles with which to train; then they were given salvaged Lee–Enfield .303-inch rifles in poor condition. At this time 57th (2nd WL) Division formed part of Second Army of Central Force in Home Forces, but in July 1916 it moved into the Emergency Reserve around Aldershot, with 2/9th King's at Mytchett. In September it moved to Blackdown Camp.

In January 1917 57th (2nd WL) Division was released for service with the BEF, and the units crossed to France in February, taking their place in the line on 25 February. The division took part in the Second Battle of Passchendaele (26 October–7 November) at the end of the Third Ypres Offensive.

During the BEF's manpower crisis of early 1918 2/9th King's was amalgamated with 1/9th King's (see above) on 31 January 1918.

=== 3/9th King's ===
The 3rd Line battalion was formed at Liverpool in May/June 1915, and in the autumn it went to Blackpool. In early 1916 it moved to the training camp at Oswestry, and on 8 April 1916 it was redesignated 9th (Reserve) Bn, King's. It was absorbed into the 7th (Reserve) Bn, King's, in the West Lancashire Reserve Brigade as Oswestry on 1 September 1916.

=== 26th King's ===
The remaining Home Service men of the TF were separated when the 3rd Line battalions were raised in May 1915, and were formed into Provisional Battalions for home defence. The men of the 9th King's joined with those from the 7th and 8th Bns of the regiment to form 44th Provisional Battalion (Territorial Force) on 1 September 1915. It joined 9th Provisional Brigade in East Kent.

In the autumn of 1915 the brigade was under the command of 57th (2nd WL) Division in Second Army of Central Force, but by July 1916 it came under Southern Army of Home Forces, with 44th Provisional Bn billeted at Ramsgate. In late 1916 9th Provisional Bde was expanded to form 73rd Division, with 44th Provisional Bn in 218th Brigade.

The Military Service Act 1916 swept away the Home/Foreign service distinction, and all TF soldiers became liable for overseas service, if medically fit. The provisional units thus became anomalous, and they became numbered battalions of their parent regiments. On 1 January 1917, 44th Provisional Bn moved to Kelvedon in Essex and was designated 26th Battalion, King's (Liverpool Regiment), still in 218th Bde. Part of the role of the former provisional units was physical conditioning to render their men fit for drafting overseas. 73rd Division was broken up in early 1918, and 26th King's was disbanded at Kelvedon on 29 March 1918.

== Disbandment ==
When the TF was reconstituted on 7 February 1920, the 9th Battalion, King's (Liverpool Regiment) was not reformed, but instead was absorbed into 55th (West Lancashire) Divisional Engineers, based in St Helens.

As part of the expansion of the Territorial Army in 1939, a new 9th Battalion, King's Regiment (Liverpool), was formed as a duplicate of 5th Bn, King's. It served during World War II and was disbanded in 1946.

== Heritage & ceremonial ==
=== Traditions ===
In 1918 and in the years after the war the senior non-commissioned officers celebrated 13 March as the anniversary of the battalion's first arrival in France in 1915.

=== Uniforms & insignia ===
The Liverpool Press Guard took their title seriously: the original uniform was based on that of the Grenadier Guards, consisting of a Bearskin headdress and scarlet tunic with blue facings and grenade badges. The buttons (worn singly, as in the Grenadier Guards) showed an old printing press. Later the battalion wore the uniform of the King's (Liverpool Regiment), which also had blue facings. After the Boer War scarlet was restricted to ceremonial dress and khaki was adopted.

While in the waterlogged trenches at Cuinchy the men wore shorts with blue hosetops above their puttees, first in shades of blue then salmon pink.

=== Honorary colonels ===
The following served as the unit's Honorary Colonel:

- George McCorquodale (former CO), appointed 3 October 1868
- William Hall Walker, TD, appointed 17 March 1897

== See also ==
- Newsreel film of 57th (2nd West Lancashire) Division liberating Lille 17 October 1918, at British Film Institute.
