= Grade II listed buildings in Liverpool-L6 =

Liverpool is a city and port in Merseyside, England, which contains many listed buildings. A listed building is a structure designated by the Secretary of State for Digital, Culture, Media and Sport (advised by Historic England) of being of architectural and/or of historical importance and, as such, is included in the National Heritage List for England. There are three grades of listing, according to the degree of importance of the structure. Grade I includes those buildings that are of "exceptional interest, sometimes considered to be internationally important"; the buildings in Grade II* are "particularly important buildings of more than special interest"; and those in Grade II are "nationally important and of special interest". Very few buildings are included in Grade I — only 2.5% of the total. Grade II* buildings represent 5.5% of the total, while the great majority, 92%, are included in Grade II.

Liverpool contains more than 1,550 listed buildings, of which 28 are in Grade I, 109 in Grade II*, and the rest in Grade II. (Note: These figures are taken from a search in the National Heritage List for England in May 2013, and are subject to variation as further buildings are listed, grades are revised, or buildings are delisted.) This list contains the Grade II listed buildings in the L6 postal district of Liverpool. The postal district contains the suburb of Fairfield, and part of Everton, once a separate village, later absorbed by the expansion of Liverpool to become another suburb. The district is mainly residential, and most of the listed buildings are houses, or associated structures. Also listed are a hospital and its associated buildings, a waterworks, a former chapel, a bandstand, a war memorial, a drinking fountain, and a pillar box.

Grade II listed buildings from other areas in the city can be found through the box on the right, along with the lists of the Grade I and Grade II* buildings in the city.

== Buildings ==
Name	Location	Photograph	Built	Notes
Office Block, Ogden Imperial Tobacco Ltd.	Boundary Lane; 53.41819°N 2.95358°W		1899	Office block of Ogden Ltd (later Ogden-Imperial Tobacco Ltd.) tobacco manufacturers, 1899, probably by Henry Hartley, eclectic Queen Anne style in pressed red brick with sandstone dressings and clock tower to centre.
—	9 and 10 Brougham Terrace; 53.41435°N 2.96053°W		1830	The remaining part of a terrace of houses, used as a mosque between 1889 and 1908, then converted into offices. It is built in brick, partly stuccoed, with stone dressings, and a slate roof. The terrace has three storeys, and is in four bays. The windows are sashes. At the top is a shallow parapet.
—	47 and 49 Everton Road; 53.41580°N 2.96462°W		1830s	Two brick houses with stone dressings and slate roofs. They have three storeys and basements, and each house is in three bays. At the top of the building is a frieze and a cornice. The windows are sashes with wedge lintels. The doorways are round-headed and the doorcases are flanked by Doric fluted columns.
—	51 Everton Road; 53.41591°N 2.96479°W		1830s	A brick house with stone dressings and a slate roof. It has three storeys and a basement, and a three-bay front. At the top of the building is a cornice. The windows are sashes with wedge lintels. The doorway is round-headed and the doorcase is flanked by Doric fluted columns.
—	53 Everton Road; 53.41600°N 2.96491°W		1830s	A brick house with stone dressings and a slate roof. It has three storeys and a basement, and a three-bay front. At the top of the building is a cornice. The windows are sashes with wedge lintels. The doorway is round-headed and the doorcase is flanked by Doric fluted columns.
—	55 Everton Road; 53.41608°N 2.96502°W		1830s	A brick house with stone dressings and a slate roof. It has three storeys and a basement, and a three-bay front. At the top of the building is a cornice. The windows are sashes with wedge lintels. The doorway is round-headed and the doorcase is flanked by Doric fluted columns.
Everton Road drill hall	57, 59 and 61 Everton Road; 53.41612°N 2.96508°W		1830s	Originally three houses, later converted into one. It is built in brick with stone dressings and a slate roof. The house has three storeys and a basement, and a nine-bay front. The central three bays break forward, and contain a carriage entrance. At the top of the building is a cornice. The windows are sashes.
—	63 Everton Road; 53.41676°N 2.96543°W		1830s	A brick house with stone dressings and a slate roof. It has three storeys and a basement, and a three-bay front. At the top of the building is a cornice. The windows are sashes with wedge lintels. The doorway is round-headed and the doorcase is in Doric style.
—	65 Everton Road; 53.41653°N 2.96554°W		1830s	A brick house with stone dressings and a slate roof. It has three storeys and a basement, and a three-bay front. At the top of the building is a cornice. The windows are sashes with wedge lintels. The doorway is round-headed and the doorcase is in Doric style.|
Bandstand	Fairfield Crescent; 53.41520°N 2.93692°W		1880s	The bandstand is at the west end of Newsham Park. It has an octagonal brick base with stone pilasters. Iron columns support a felted roof.
Reservoir retaining wall	Hodson Place; 53.41943°N 2.96404°W		1854	A stone retaining wall of a reservoir. It runs for 692 metres (2,270 ft) along Hodson Place, and has a round turret at the east end and an octagonal turret at the west end. The wall then runs south for 53.5 metres (176 ft).
—	4 Laurel Road; 53.4130°N 2.9381°W		1860s	A stuccoed house with a slate roof. It has two storeys, and is in three bays. In the ground floor are canted bay windows containing casements. The windows in the upper floor have architraves, friezes, and cornices, the central window has a segmental pediment.
—	6 Laurel Road; 53.4127°N 2.9380°W		1860s	A stuccoed house with a hipped slate roof. It has two storeys, and is in three bays. In the ground floor are canted bay windows with entablatures and a parapet. In the upper floor the windows have archivolts, keystones, and pediments. All the windows are casements.
South building, Water Works	Margaret Street; 53.4191°N 2.9630°W		1857	A stone building in two storeys. On the front are two bays, with one bay on the sides. There is a single storey adjoining block with three bays.
Water tower and building	Margaret Street; 53.4195°N 2.9632°W		1857	This consists of a circular three-stage water tower with an iron water tank, a square tower to the south, and further to the south is a two-storey block in four bays. The whole structure is built in stone.
Judge's House	Newsham Drive; 53.4207°N 2.9443°W	—	Late 18th century	Initially known as Newsham House, it was converted in 1866–67 to act as Judges' Lodgings. It is built in brick on a stone base, with stone dressings and a hipped slate roof. The house has three storeys with a basement, and a five-bay front. The middle three bays break forward under a pediment. The porch contains pairs of Corinthian columns, and the windows are sashes with wedge lintels. On the left of the house is an extension containing a circular library.
Stable and coach house, Judge's House	Newsham Drive; 53.42058°N 2.94475°W	—	Late 18th century	A building in brick with stone dressings and a slate roof. It has two storeys, and a front of eight bays. The central two bays break forward under a pediment. On the ground floor are carriage openings, inserted garage doors, and sash windows. The upper floor contains square and round glazed pitch holes.
Newsham Park Hospital	Orphan Drive; 53.4212°N 2.9349°W		1871–75	Originally the Royal Seamen's Orphan Institution, later a hospital. It was designed by Alfred Waterhouse and is built in brick with stone dressings and a slate roof. It is in two and three storeys, and has two ranges. The west range is symmetrical with 19 bays; the south range is smaller, and is architecturally simpler. At the corner of the ranges is a tower with an octagonal stair turret. Other features include oriel windows and a flèche.
Lodge to north of Newsham Park Hospital	Orphan Drive; 53.4224°N 2.9357°W		1871–75	The building was designed by Alfred Waterhouse. It is built in brick with stone dressings and has a slate roof. The building is in two storeys. It has a projecting bays under a gable and contains three-light mullioned windows.
Building to south of Newsham Park Hospital	Orphan Drive; 53.4209°N 2.9337°W		1871–75	The building was designed by Alfred Waterhouse and is attached to the hospital by a corridor. It is built in brick with stone dressings and has a slate roof. The building is in three storeys and an attic, and has a front of four bays with dormers.
The Hollies	1 Prospect Vale; 53.4138°N 2.9375°W		c. 1840	A stuccoed house with a slate roof, in two storeys. It has three bays on each side. The windows in the upper floor are sashed; in the ground floor some are blind; others are casements. The doorway has an architrave with a frieze and a cornice.
Particular Baptist Chapel	Shaw Street; 53.41246°N 2.96766°W		1847	The chapel was converted into flats in 2004. It is built in brick with sandstone dressings and a slate roof. Its front has three bays, and along the sides are five bays. It has an Ionic porch with angle pilasters, at the top of which is an entablature and a pediment.
War Memorial, Whitley Gardens	Shaw Street; 53.41477°N 2.96881°W		1863	A memorial to members of the 8th (The King's) Regiment who died in the Indian Mutiny in 1857–58. Originally in Portsmouth, it was moved to Chelsea in 1877, and to Liverpool in 1911. It consists of a Celtic cross on a sandstone base. Around the base of the cross are reliefs, and on the base is an inscription.
—	41–49 Shaw Street; 53.41398°N 2.96894°W	41-49 Shaw St Everton	1830s	A terrace of five brick houses with stone dressings and a slate roof. They have three storeys, basements and attics. Each house has a three-bay front. At the top of the building is a frieze and a cornice. The windows are sashes with wedge lintels. The doorways have Ionic surrounds. On the first floors are balconies.
—	51 Shaw Street; 53.41420°N 2.96915°W		1830s	A brick house with stone dressings and a slate roof. It has three storeys and a basement, with a three-bay front. At the top of the building is a frieze and a cornice. The windows have wedge lintels. The windows in the first floor are sashes, with casements in the top floor. The door has an Ionic surround.
—	53 Shaw Street; 53.41436°N 2.96923°W		1830s	A brick house with stone dressings and a slate roof. It has three storeys and a basement, with a three-bay front. At the top of the building is a frieze and a cornice. The windows are sashes with wedge lintels. The door has an Ionic surround.
—	55 Shaw Street; 53.41440°N 2.96926°W		1830s	A brick house with stone dressings and a slate roof. It has three storeys and a basement, with a three-bay front. At the top of the building is a frieze and a cornice. The windows are sashes with wedge lintels. The door has an Ionic surround.
—	57 Shaw Street; 53.41449°N 2.96931°W		1830s	A brick house with stone dressings and a slate roof. It has three storeys and a basement, with a three-bay front. At the top of the building is a frieze and a cornice. The windows are sashes with wedge lintels. The door has an Ionic surround.
—	59 and 61 Shaw Street; 53.41458°N 2.96936°W		1830s	Two brick houses with stone dressings and slate roofs. At the top of the building is a frieze and a cornice. The windows are a mix of sashes and casements, with wedge lintels. The doors have an Ionic surround.
—	63, 65 and 67 Shaw Street; 53.41471°N 2.96941°W		1830s	Three brick houses with stone dressings and slate roofs. At the top of the building is a frieze and a cornice. The windows are sashes with wedge lintels. The doors have an Ionic surround.
—	69 and 71 Shaw Street; 53.41488°N 2.96950°W		1830s	Two brick houses with stone dressings and slate roofs. They have three storeys and a basement, and each house is in three bays. At the top of the building is a frieze and a cornice. The windows are sashes with wedge lintels. The doors have Ionic surrounds.
—	105 and 107 Shaw Street; 53.41646°N 2.97032°W		1830s	Two brick houses with stone dressings and slate roofs, now derelict. They have three storeys and basements, and each house is in five bays. At the top of the building is a frieze and a cornice. The windows have wedge lintels, and the doors have Ionic surrounds.
—	115, 117 and 119 Shaw Street; 53.41697°N 2.97056°W		1830s	Three brick houses with stone dressings and slate roofs. They have three storeys and basements, and each house is in five bays. At the top of the building is a frieze and a cornice. The windows have wedge lintels, and the doors have Ionic surrounds.
—	63 Walton Road; 53.43227°N 2.97398°W		1830s	A brick house with stone dressings and a slate roof. It has three storeys with a three-bay front. The third bay breaks forward under half a pediment. At the top of the building is a cornice. The windows are a mix of sashes and casements with wedge lintels. The enclosed porch has pairs of Ionic columns supporting an entablature.
Bowden Drinking Fountain	West Derby Road; 53.41476°N 2.95996°W		1913	The stone drinking fountain stands on a square of polished red marble. Volute brackets rise from the angles and support a square cap with obelisks. On the top is a small cupola with an obelisk finial. At the front are curving balustraded steps.

== See also ==
- Architecture of Liverpool
