= William Herdman =

William Herdman may refer to:

- William Abbott Herdman (1858–1924), Scottish marine zoologist and oceanographer
- William Gawin Herdman, English author and painter
