= Everton Park, Liverpool =

Park in Everton, Liverpool, England

Everton Park
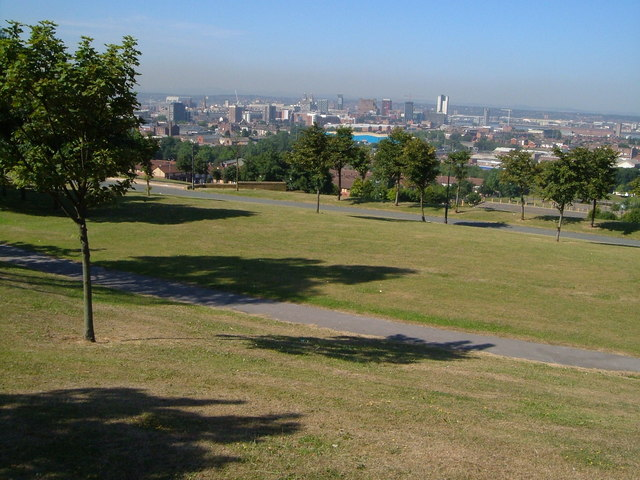
- Everton Park with Liverpool City Centre in the background
- Interactive map of Everton Park
- Type: Public park
- Location: Everton, Liverpool, England
- Coordinates: 53.420°N 2.972°W
- Area: 40 hectares (0.40 km^{2})
- Created: 1984-89
- Operator: Liverpool City Council
- Status: Open all year round

Everton Park, located in Everton, Liverpool, England, is a modern park, covering over 40 hectares (0.40 km^{2}), created between 1984 and 1989, as part of a major house clearance programme, on Everton Hill between Great Homer Street and Everton Road/Heyworth Street. The park is Liverpool City Council owned.

The park features the Everton Park Nature Garden, a walled community garden with three ponds, bridges, paths, overhanging trees, a wildflower field, raised flower beds with seating, and colourful wild birds.

Prince Rupert's Tower (a Georgian village lock-up), and St George's Church are also located within Everton Park.

The park is split into loosely defined sections (according to Ordnance Survey), such as Whitley Gardens, Brow Side Gardens, Everton Nature Garden, and the Rupert Lane Recreation Ground, the latter tracing its heritage to a former building known as Rupert House, commemorating the royal visit of Prince Rupert in 1644, during the siege of Liverpool in the English Civil War. The former building (still standing by 1830) was built upon and converted into a militia barracks, then into a recreation ground by 1930, then was integrated with the rest of what would be called Everton Park in the early 1980s.

== History ==
During the mid-20th century, the area became notorious for its cramped terraced slums, visible from the River Mersey and unfit for human habitation. During the 1950s and 60s, demolition planning for many of the Victorian era streets commenced. Gaps in the housing of the area appeared over the following decades as streets and buildings disappeared. Following the clearance of the slums, some of housing were replaced by high-rise flats in the 1960s, such as a group of 14-storey three tower blocks nicknamed "the Piggeries". Within 18 months, they fell into disrepair and were subsequently demolished in the 1980s. The remaining population of the area resettled in areas such as Kirkby, Cantril Farm, and Netherley.

In August 1967, it was reported that Liverpool City Council were having second thoughts on their £1.25m scheme, despite being warned by council leader William Sefton that "the council would never live down the shame it would bring on the planning of the city". By 1978, the majority of clearances of the Victorian streets and housing of the area was completed, and the space which is now occupied by the Rupert Lane Recreation Ground and Whitley Gardens had been completely cleared. The urban clearances are said to have greatly reduced the population of Everton (estimated between 100,000 and 150,000) and have greatly transformed the area from dense slums to an open natural environment, offering views of the docks and the city skyline from its hills.
