= Herdman =

Herdman is an English surname. Notable people with the surname include:

- Alexander Herdman (1869–1953), New Zealand politician
- Bob Herdman (born 1966), American musician
- John Herdman (born 1975), English football manager
- Joshua Herdman (born 1987), English actor
- Martin Herdman (born 1956), English actor and rugby league player, father of Joshua Herdman
- Priscilla Herdman, American folk singer
- William Abbott Herdman (1858–1924), Scottish marine zoologist and oceanographer
- William Gawin Herdman (1805–1882) English author and painter
