= Frank Ramsey =

Frank Ramsey may refer to:

- Frank P. Ramsey (1903–1930), English mathematician, philosopher, and economist
- Frank Ramsey (basketball) (1931–2018), American basketball Hall of Famer

== See also ==
- Frank William Ramsay (1875–1954), senior British Army officer in World War I
