= George McCorquodale =

English printer

George McCorquodale (10 May 1817 – 1895) was an English printer who founded the McCorquodale Group, once one of the UK's largest printing companies.

== Career ==
McCorquodale was the son of Hugh McCorquodale and Lucia Hall. He started his printing career in Liverpool, opening a stationers shop, Liverpool Printing and Stationery Co. Ltd, in 1841, then founding McCorquodale & Co Ltd in Newton-le-Willows in 1846, taking over and converting the former South Lancashire Conservative Association Hall. The company became well known as a printer for the rail industry, producing many British railway companies' tickets, timetables, posters and other printed work. During the 1870s, McCorquodale opened further factories in Glasgow, London and Leeds. In 1878, Sir Richard Moon, chairman of the London and North Western Railway invited McCorquodale to build a printing works in the railway town of Wolverton. This specialised in printing registered envelopes later diversified into books and commercial stationery.

During the invasion scare of 1859–60, many of McCorquodale's workers joined the 73rd (Newton-le-Willows) Lancashire Rifle Volunteer Corps. On 10 January 1861 McCorquodale raised the 'Liverpool Press Guard' from employees of the newspaper and printing trades in the city, and on 21 February 1861, the officers and men of the new unit took the oath of allegiance at St George's Hall, Liverpool. It was designated the 80th (Liverpool Press Guard) Lancashire Rifle Volunteer Corps and soon consisted of six companies, commanded by McCorquodale with the rank of Lieutenant-Colonel. The 73rd RVC was incorporated as G Company of the 80th in 1863. McCorquodale retired from the command on 3 October 1868, becoming the unit's first Honorary Colonel.

He held the office of High Sheriff of Lancashire in 1882, and High Sheriff of Anglesey in 1889, living in retirement at Gadlys in Anglesey.

== Family ==
McCorquodale married, firstly, Louisa Kate Honan, daughter of Frederick Honan, on 24 December 1844, and lived for a time in a large house (demolished in the 1930s) in what is today Newton-le-Willows' Willow Park, Merseyside. They had many issues including, Harold McCorquodale (1865-1943), whose son was Kenneth McCorquodale (1894-1976, father of Alistair McCorquodale)

After his first wife died in 1870, he married, secondly, Emily Sanderson, daughter of Reverend Thomas Sanderson and Eliza Baddeley, on 1 January 1872 at Southover Church, Lewes in Sussex. They had 2 children.

When McCorquodale died in 1895 he left an estate valued at £439,396 (about £48 million in today's terms).
