= Matalan =

British fashion and homeware retailer

Matalan Retail Ltd
- Formerly: Matalan (Salford) Limited (1987–1988); Matalan (Cash & Carry) Limited (1988–1992); Matalan Discount Club (Cash & Carry) Ltd. (1992–1998)
- Type: Privately held company
- Industry: Retail
- Founded: (1985; 41 years ago) in Preston, Lancashire
- Headquarters: Knowsley, Merseyside
- Area served: United Kingdom; Middle East
- Key people: Karl-Heinz Holland (Chairman)
- Products: Clothing; Homewares
- Revenue: ▲£2.9 billion GBP (2024)
- Owner: John Hargreaves & family
- Website: www.matalan.co.uk (UK); matalanme.com (Middle East)

Matalan Retail Ltd is a British clothing and homewares retailer based in Knowsley, Merseyside, founded by John Hargreaves in 1985.

In August 1988, its operations director at the time, Duncan Sullivan, transformed Matalan into an out-of-town warehouse-style, membership-only cash-and-carry business, inspired by Sam's Club in the United States. The membership-only model was phased out by March 1998. Matalan's turnover grew from £26m in 1992 to £800m in 1998, with over seven million customers and a £1bn valuation on the London Stock Exchange.

As of June 2024, the retailer has 230 locations domestically, as well as a number of franchise outlets in the Middle East. The retailer is a wholly owned subsidiary of Missouri Topco Limited, a holding company which is based in Guernsey, and is controlled by the Hargreaves family.

== History ==
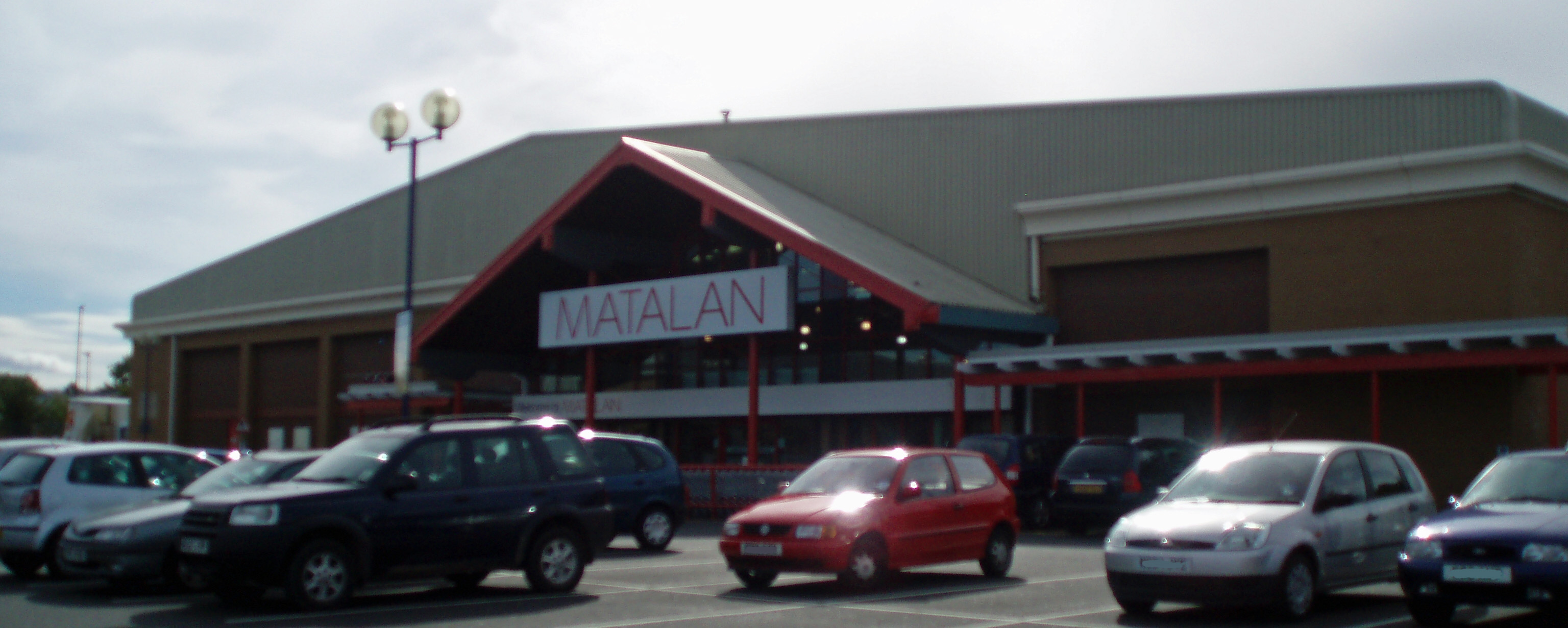
A Matalan shop at Kingston Park, Newcastle upon Tyne (2007)

In 1985, John Hargreaves opened the first Matalan store at Bamber Bridge, near Preston, Lancashire. There were fifty stores by 1995, and in 1997, the company moved its headquarters from Preston to Skelmersdale, also in Lancashire. The company was floated on the London Stock Exchange in 1998, but taken private again by the Hargreaves family in October 2006.

During 2009, John Hargreaves sought to sell off Matalan, but by February 2010, had failed to find buyers willing to meet the £1.5 billion price. Jason Hargreaves was appointed managing director in July 2013. The headquarters moved to a purpose built site at Knowsley, Merseyside in 2014. The company won approval for this scheme in October 2012.

In September 2018, it began a partnership with toy retailer The Entertainer, who opened 59 in-store concessions as 'Totally Toys'.

In June 2020, Matalan confirmed that they would name a new chairman and a new chief commercial officer less than a month after John Mills stated he would step down from the board. Steve Johnson succeeded Mills as the next chairperson of the value retailer, while James Brown moved into the completely new Chief Commercial Officer position at the company. In July 2020, Matalan filed for Chapter 15 bankruptcy in the United States.

In March 2023, it was announced that former Co-op Food CEO, Jo Whitfield, would be joining Matalan as chief executive. Whitfield served in various executive roles at Matalan between 2002 and 2008.

In October 2024, after only 18 months, Jo Whitfield left the position of CEO to pursue a her own portfolio career.

=== Middle East operations ===
In the Middle East, the Matalan brand is franchised to BTC Fashion General Trading, based in Qatar. BTC have stores in Bahrain, Jordan, Oman, Qatar, Saudi Arabia, Egypt and the United Arab Emirates. There is also at least one store in Georgia (at the City Mall, Tbilisi).

== 2013 Rana Plaza collapse ==
Matalan was among the companies that sourced clothes from the Rana Plaza factory in Bangladesh which collapsed, killing 1,134 in April 2013. In July 2014, they were the focus of a campaign by 38 Degrees and Labour Behind the Label, for failing to contribute to the official compensation fund coordinated by the ILO. This was in contrast to some of their main competitors, such as Primark who contributed $9 million.

After pressure, they announced that they would contribute an undisclosed amount. It was later revealed that they had paid £60,000 into the fund, which labour rights campaigns challenged as being an insufficient amount compared with other retailers.
