= Everton Water Tower =

Water tower in Liverpool, England

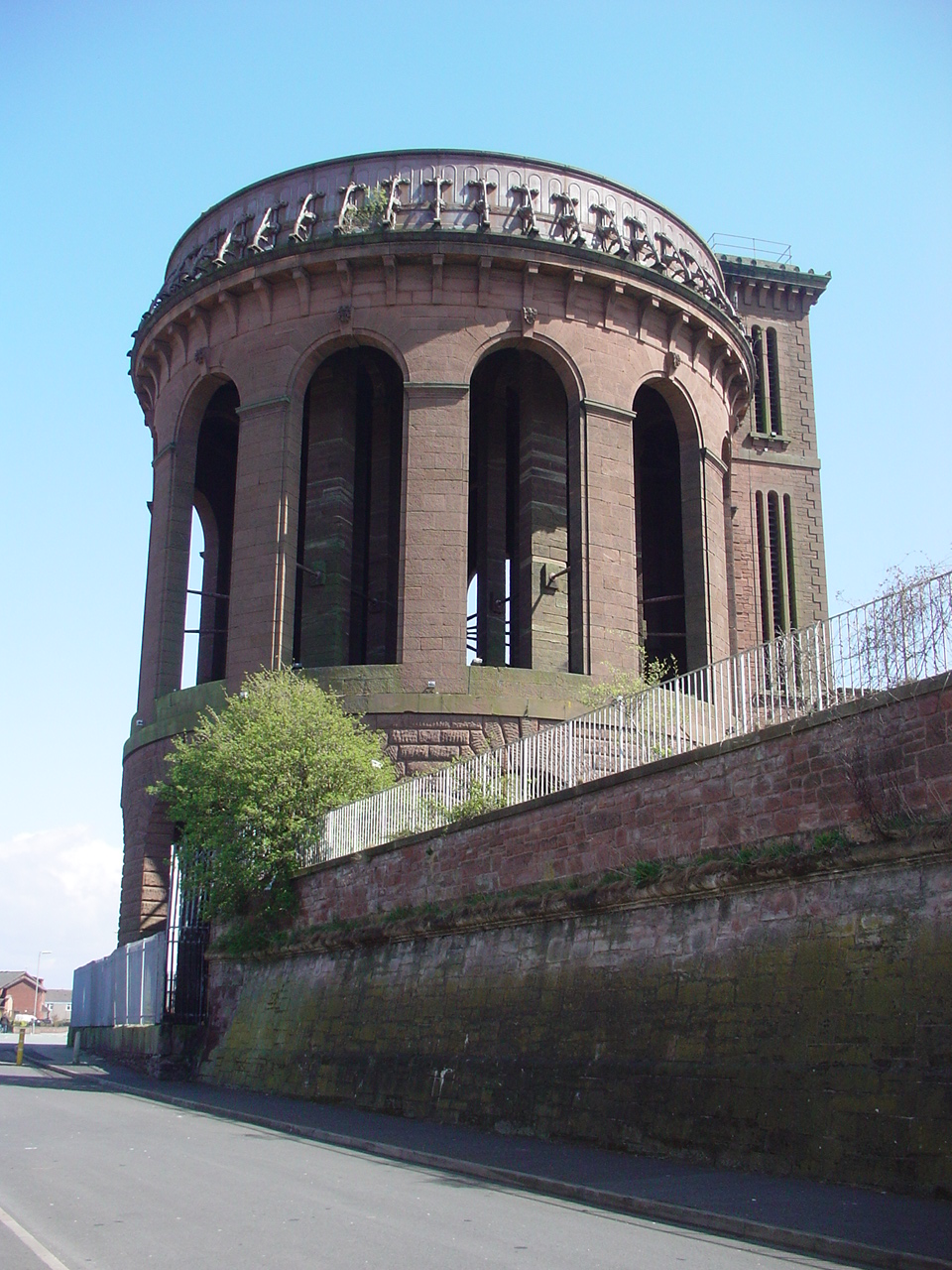
- The water tower in April 2013
- Interactive map of the Everton Water Tower area

General information
- Type: Water tower
- Location: Everton, Liverpool, England
- Coordinates: 53.41960°N 2.96315°W
- Completed: 1857
- Client: Liverpool City Council

Listed Building – Grade II
- Official name: Water Tower and North Building of Water Works
- Designated: 12 July 1966
- Reference no.: 1070630

Everton Water Tower is a water tower situated on Margaret Street in Everton, Liverpool. Now surrounded by a modern housing estate it is a Grade II listed building. The water tower is a well-known landmark dating from 1857 and can be seen from most of Liverpool standing at the top of Everton brow.

== Structure ==
Designed by the Liverpool's first water engineer, Thomas Duncan, it is all that is visible of the 1.5-acre (0.61 ha) 12 feet (3.7 m) deep water service reservoir. The masonry hides a cast iron tank 90 feet (27 m) above ground level.

The tower consists of 3 stages. The first stage is made up of an arcade of 12 arches in a rusticated style. The second stage also consists of a 12 arch arcade with each arch having an impost band and keystone and a top bracketed cornice. The final stage is recessed and contains the water tank with iron supporting brackets.

== History ==
The building was placed up for sale by owner, United Utilities, in July 2018 as they maintained the structure no longer had any operational use and had not been used for the storage or distribution of water for "many years." The tower was taken off sale later in the month when it was revealed that United Utilities had been approached by a charity with a proposal for the future use of the site. Despite the proposals, nothing came of them and in February 2019 the building was auctioned and sold for £70,000. Despite putting in planning permission for building apartments and replacing the roof with a glazed structure, no development work was undertaken and the building was put up for auction again in 2023.

== See also ==
- Grade II listed buildings in Liverpool-L6
