= Everton, Liverpool =

Suburb of Liverpool, England

Coordinates: 53.4188°N 2.9661°W

Everton
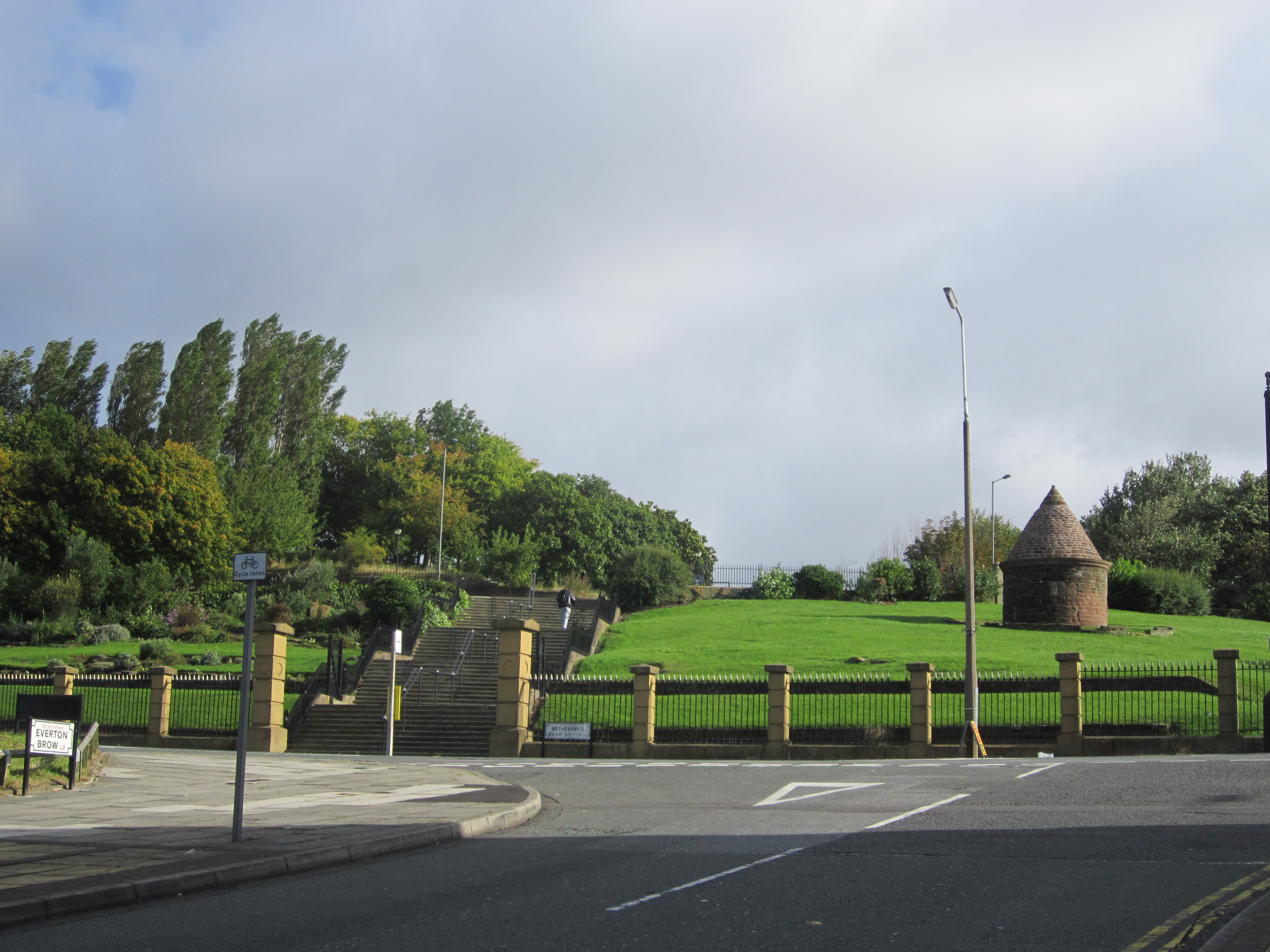
- Everton Brow, with Everton Lock-Up visible

- Location within Merseyside
- Population: 14,782 (2011 Census)
- OS grid reference: SJ358917
- Metropolitan borough: Liverpool
- Metropolitan county: Merseyside
- Region: North West
- Country: England
- Sovereign state: United Kingdom
- Post town: LIVERPOOL
- Postcode district: L3, L5, L6
- Dialling code: 0151
- Police: Merseyside
- Fire: Merseyside
- Ambulance: North West
- UK Parliament: Liverpool Walton

Everton is a suburb of north Liverpool, in Merseyside, England, and part of the Liverpool Walton constituency. It is bordered by Vauxhall to the west, Kirkdale to the north, and Anfield to the north-east. Historically in Lancashire, at the 2011 Census the population was 14,782.

== Toponymy ==
The name Everton is derived from the Saxon word eofor, meaning wild boar that lives in forests. In 1830, local historian Robert Syers proposed an alternative origin for Everton's name. He noted that earlier residents called it 'Yerton', a claim supported by James Stonehouse, his near contemporary, some thirty years later. Syers contended that in the Domesday Book of 1086, Everton was labelled Hiretun, meaning higher-town, signifying its elevated position. He suggested 'Yerton' could be a corruption of Hiretun or Oureton (higher-town or over-town respectively).

== History ==
Everton is an ancient settlement and, like Liverpool, was one of the six unnamed berewicks of West Derby. For many centuries, Everton was a small township. An early type of census conducted in 1327 recorded nineteen heads of household, suggesting a population of approximately ninety-five individuals. By 1692, only 135 people lived in Everton, and by 1714, the population had not exceeded 140 inhabitants. Before the middle of the eighteenth century, the residents were primarily individuals of modest means, engaged in agricultural activities as landowners and cultivators. Occasionally wealthier settlers, along with their families, who had withdrawn from commercial pursuits, chose to reside in Everton. During this time, the distinction between the upper classes and the middle or lower classes was minimal, in terms of both demeanour and lifestyle.

Until the late 18th century Everton was a small rural parish of Walton-on-the-Hill, but the rise in prosperity of nearby Liverpool pushed its wealthier merchants towards Everton and further afield. The population of the township experienced significant growth during this period. By 1769, the population had risen to 253 individuals, reaching 370 by 1790, 499 by 1801, and 913 by 1811. A record of citizens from 1815 reveals a substantial change in the character of the township, with a disproportionately large number of its population listed as merchants or gentlemen not engaged in trade. Writing of this period in 1869, James Stonehouse recalled that 'Fifty years ago Everton was a courtly place, wherein resided the richest merchants, the most distinguished citizens, and the most fashionable and leading families. Indeed, so high did the inhabitants hold their heads, in consequence of their wealth, stability, and position, that they were termed “Everton nobles.”’

In his History of Everton, published in 1830, Robert Syers wrote of the merchants, 'It is this class of persons, principally, that has made Everton what it is; their wealth and attention have transformed a spot which, not long ago, was little better than an unsightly common – a neglected waste – into a modern arcadia…’ Prominent in this context was James Atherton, a Liverpool merchant and real estate developer. Having acquired a substantial amount of land on Everton Hill and its surroundings, he embarked on the transformation of the north-west district of the township. Atherton laid-out several well-known streets, including Albion Crescent (now Albion Street), Northumberland Terrace, York Terrace, and Grecian Terrace, embellishing them with 'handsome mansions and delightful villas.' Additionally, he donated the land for the construction of St. George’s Church. Notably, James Atherton's impact extended beyond Everton, founding the seaside resort of New Brighton in 1830. He was laid to rest at St George's Church.

Before 1803, the site of St George's Church was occupied by the Everton beacon, one of the area's most famous landmarks. It was a modest square tower built from local red sandstone. Standing at approximately 25 feet, the two-storied tower featured a ground floor serving as a kitchen, an apartment above for the guard, and a flat roof or terrace for the beacon fire. A turret at the northwest corner provided shelter for the watchman. The interior had a stone staircase leading to the upper room, and a similar flight to the roof, which offered views of up to thirty miles, or fifty miles if conditions were optimal. Over time, the tower's square-headed windows became frameless and exposed to the elements and its only inhabitants were the cattle grazing in beacon-field. By December 1802, the beacon was in a dilapidated state with an earth and clay floor, a deteriorated fireplace, and its upper apartment described as 'bare, cheerless, and dungeon-like'. Debate surrounds the beacon's construction date, with suggestions generally ranging from pre-Armada to post-1327. Its fate was sealed in 1803 when, during a stormy night, the structure collapsed. Speculation persists that it might have been deliberately undermined by someone viewing it and its visitors as a nuisance. Notably, during the English Civil War, the beacon served as a venue for marriages following the expulsion of loyal clergy from Liverpool, foreshadowing the future use of the site for a church.

By the early 19th century, Liverpool's demand for housing saw Everton begin to be built up. In 1821, the population was 2,109 and by 1829 it had risen to an estimated 3,763 (calculated from 579 inhabited houses). Everton became part of Liverpool in 1835. Commenting on the transformation of Everton in 1869, Stonehouse noted that 'Within the last fifteen years…the process of metamorphosis has gone on until one of the pleasantest suburbs of Liverpool has become as life-teeming, cottage-bearing, and street-streaming as the densest part of Liverpool itself. Hosts of cottages now swarm up the hill sides, scramble over the top, and flood the plain on its summit.

Along with neighbouring Vauxhall, Everton housed a very large Irish population. Sectarianism was one negative consequence of religious differences with tensions between Catholics and Protestants existing well into the 20th century. St Domingo Road in Everton was the intended site for the building of the Metropolitan Cathedral, but this was abandoned owing to financial constraints. The cathedral was eventually located in the city centre near to the southern edge of Everton.

Everton was formerly a township in the parish of Walton-on-the-Hill, in 1866 Everton became a separate civil parish, on 1 April 1922 the parish was abolished and merged with Liverpool. In 1921 the parish had a population of 124,414.

Urban clearance during the 1960s and 1970s, followed by the creation of Everton Park, changed the face of the area and some parts have never recovered. The population has plummeted by over 100,000 since the 1960s; Everton Park has replaced the densely packed streets with fields and trees. The landscape of Everton is now mainly non-urban with the loss of so many people and many hundreds of buildings.

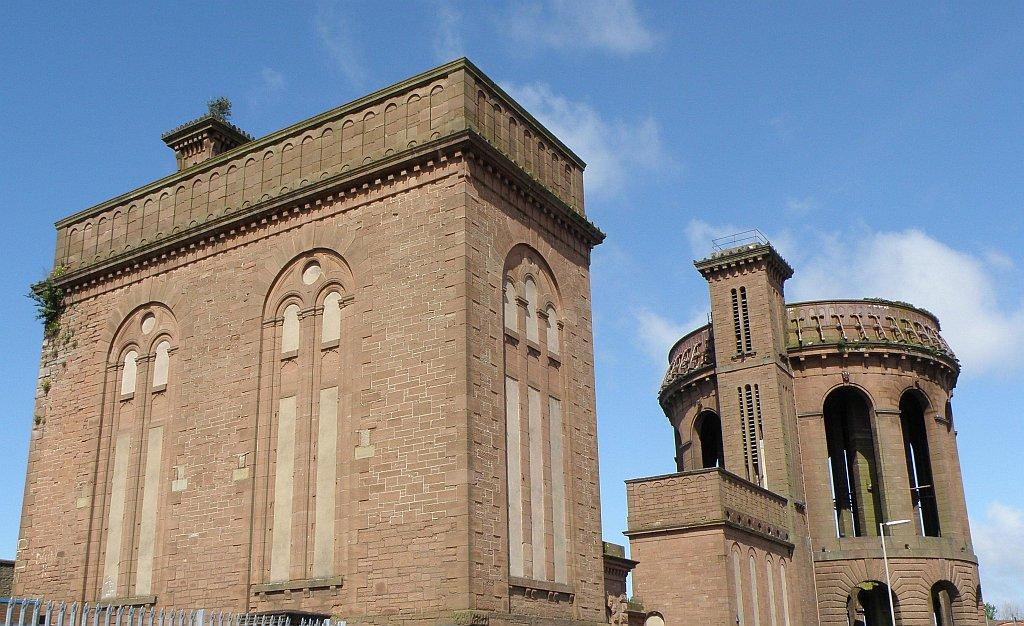
Everton Water Tower, 1864

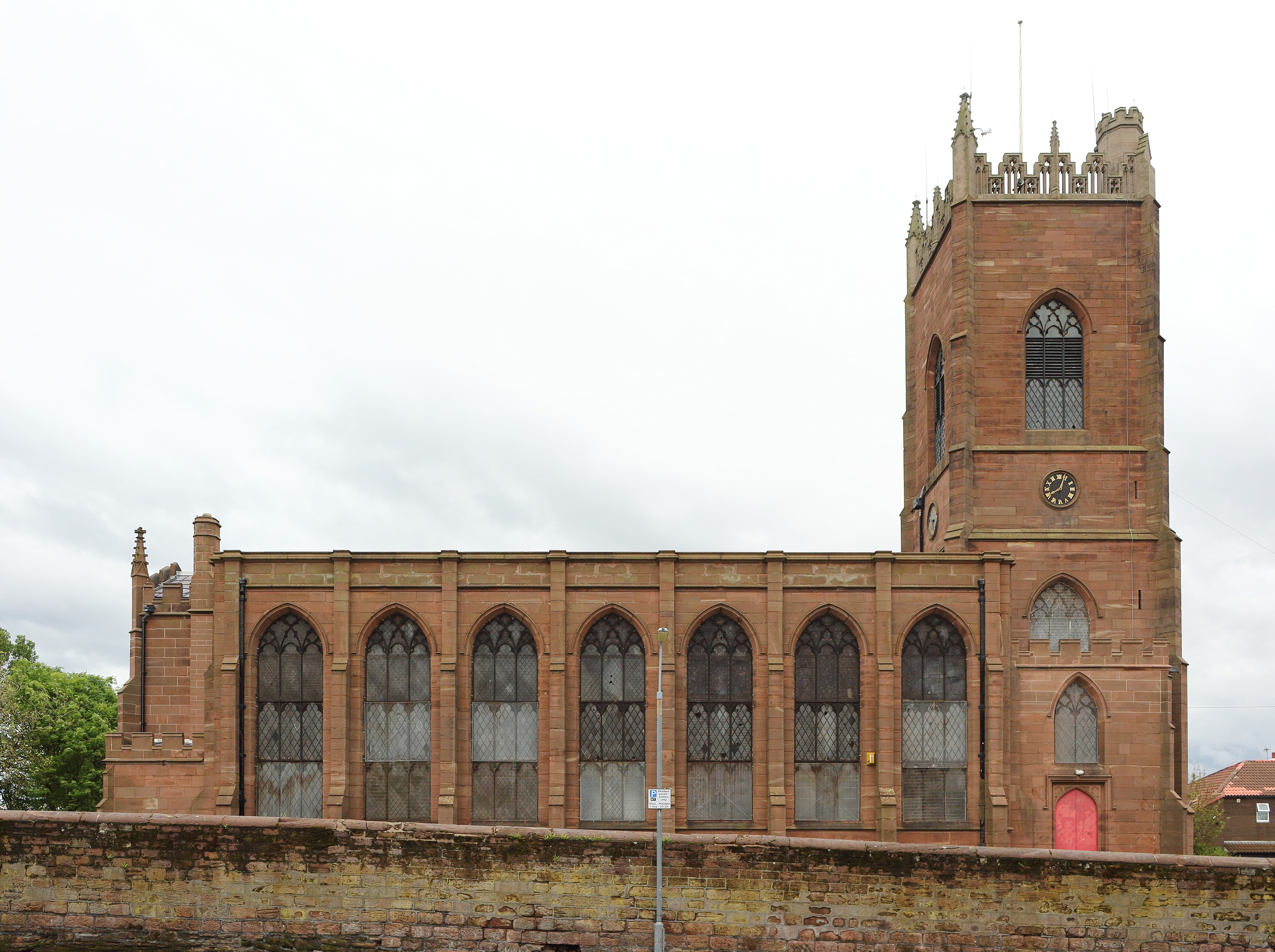
St George's Church, Everton

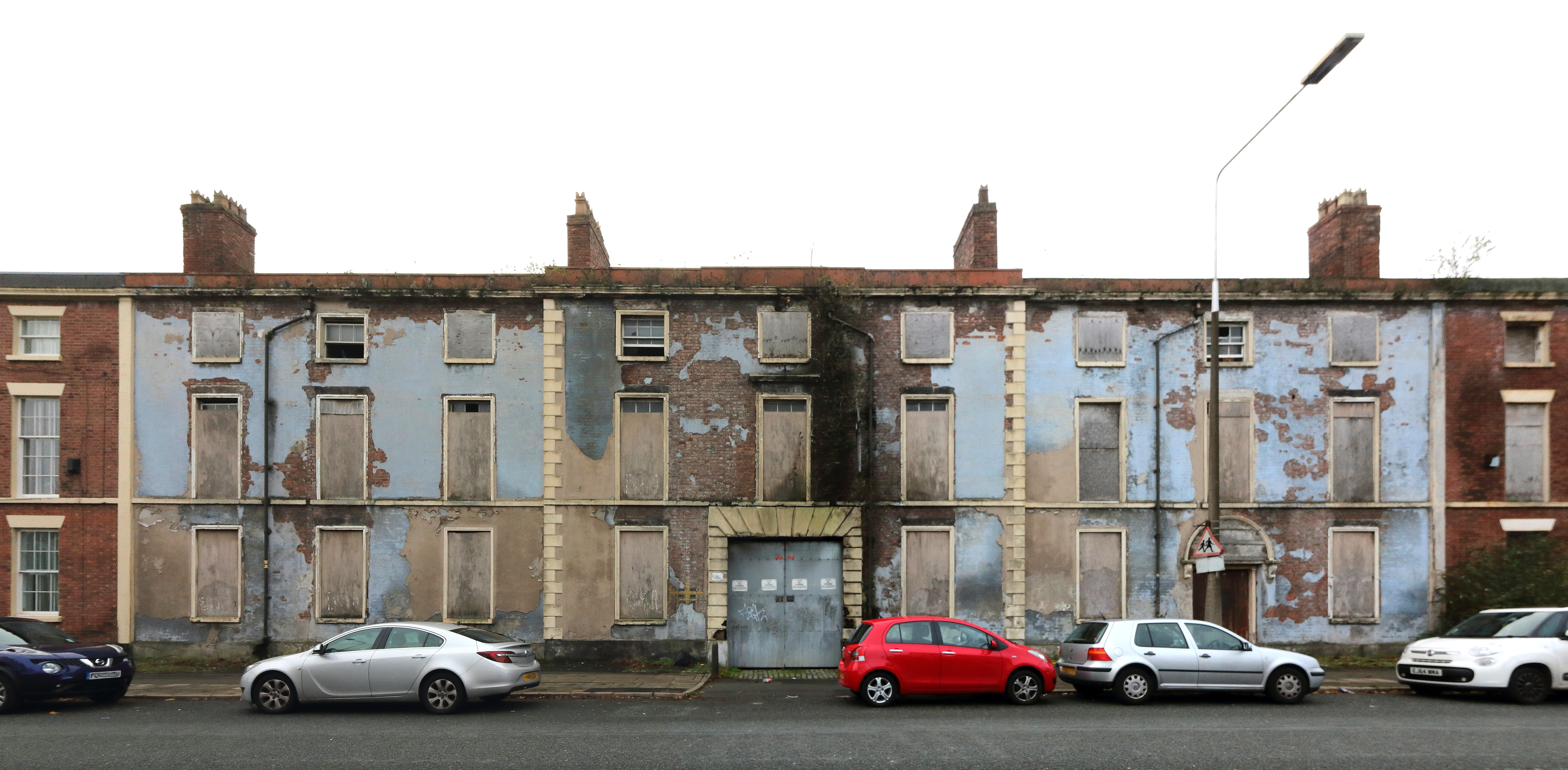
Everton Road drill hall

2003 view of the city from Everton Park

A new district centre on Great Homer Street was opened in 2017, code named 'Project Jennifer' it was advertised as a scheme to breathe new life into the rundown parts of Everton centred on Great Homer Street including a revamped 'Greaty' (branded Greatie) market. The project suffered numerous delays and setbacks through the proposal and construction stages, but was ultimately opened in June 2017, with the opening of a Sainsbury's supermarket. The NSPCC Hargreaves Centre (named after locally born benefactor John Hargreaves) was opened in May 2007 on the site of the former indoor market.

== Notable residents ==
- James Atherton, merchant and founder of New Brighton
- William Connolly (VC), soldier
- Thomas de Quincey, 19th-century author
- Bill Dean, Liverpool actor
- Gordon Elliott, Australian journalist and talk-show host
- Prince William Frederick, Duke of Gloucester, soldier, Military Commander of the North West District
- William Gawin Herdman, author and painter
- Paul Aloysius Kenna, cavalry officer and VC recipient
- Paul McCartney, musician
- George Mahon (Everton F.C. chairman), an Everton F.C. founding father
- Prince Rupert of the Rhine, soldier
- Tommy Scott, musician and frontman of Space, was born in this area.
- Anne Sharp, teacher and close friend of novelist Jane Austen
- Robert Tressell, author
- Robb Wilton, English comedian and actor

== Landmarks ==
- Everton Lock-Up
- Everton Road drill hall, TA Centre used by the 9th Kings during the Second Boer War and the First World War
- Everton water tower, listed building
- St George's Church, Everton
- Everton Library
- Provincial Grand Orange Lodge of Liverpool, oversees the 9 Orange districts in Merseyside and their 85 Orange Lodges

== Sport ==
The football club Everton F.C. (originally called St. Domingo F.C.) is named after the area (St. Domingo Methodist Chapel was in Everton). The district is also the location of a building on the club's crest, Everton Lock-Up, known locally as Prince Rupert's Tower. Barker and Dobson, a local sweet manufacturer, introduced 'Everton Mints' to honour Everton Football Club.

Ironically, Everton F.C. has never actually played in the area. Its first three homes were located in Anfield, including Stanley Park; the club played at Goodison Park in the area of Walton from 1892 to 2025 before relocating to Hill Dickinson Stadium on the Bramley-Moore Dock in the area of Vauxhall. In addition, Everton Cemetery is also not located in Everton, it lies further north-east in the district of Fazakerley.

The football club Liverpool F.C. was originally founded as 'Everton Football Club and Athletic Ground Company, Ltd', or 'Everton Athletic', on 26 January 1892, as a consequence of the Everton F.C. split that resulted in Everton F.C.'s move to Goodison Park in 1892. The former Evertonians who founded 'Everton Athletic' to play at Anfield renamed the club 'Liverpool F.C.' on 3 June 1892.

== Schools ==
- Beacon Church of England Primary
- Campion Catholic High School (demolished 2006)
- Notre Dame Catholic College
- Our Lady Immaculate Catholic Primary
- Whitefield Primary School
