= John Hargreaves (businessman) =

British businessman

- Born: January 1944 (age 82); Everton, Liverpool, England
- Known for: Founder and former chairman, Matalan
- Children: 3

John Hargreaves (born January 1944) is a Monaco-based British businessman, the founder and former chairman of the UK out-of-town discount clothing and homeware chain Matalan.

== Career ==
John Hargreaves was born in January 1944 in Everton, the son of a docks labourer, one of eight children who all shared one bedroom in a Liverpool terrace house.

Hargreaves left school at 14, went into the retail business when he was 16, and opened the first Matalan store in Preston in 1985. Matalan has over 200 stores in the UK, and employs over 16,000 people. He resigned as chairman of Matalan in November 2007, less than a year after taking the company private. His daughter Maxine purchased British womenswear retailer Fenn Wright Manson for an undisclosed sum on 28 March 2012.

According to The Sunday Times Rich List in 2025, Hargreaves' net worth was estimated to be £350 million.

== Personal life ==
Hargreaves married aged 19 and has three children, Jason, Jamey and Maxine.

Hargreaves resides in Monaco with his wife. Alleging non-residence in the UK from March 2000, he claimed that he was not liable to capital gains tax on a gain of £231 million arising on the disposal of Matalan shares in May 2000. This claim was resisted by Her Majesty's Revenue and Customs and the matter was litigated. Hargreaves subsequently accepted that he was not in fact non-resident in 2000/01 and his appeal was dismissed. See John Hargreaves v HMRC [2022] UKUT 00034 (TCC). This meant he could be liable to pay up to £135 million.
