= Newsham Park Hospital =

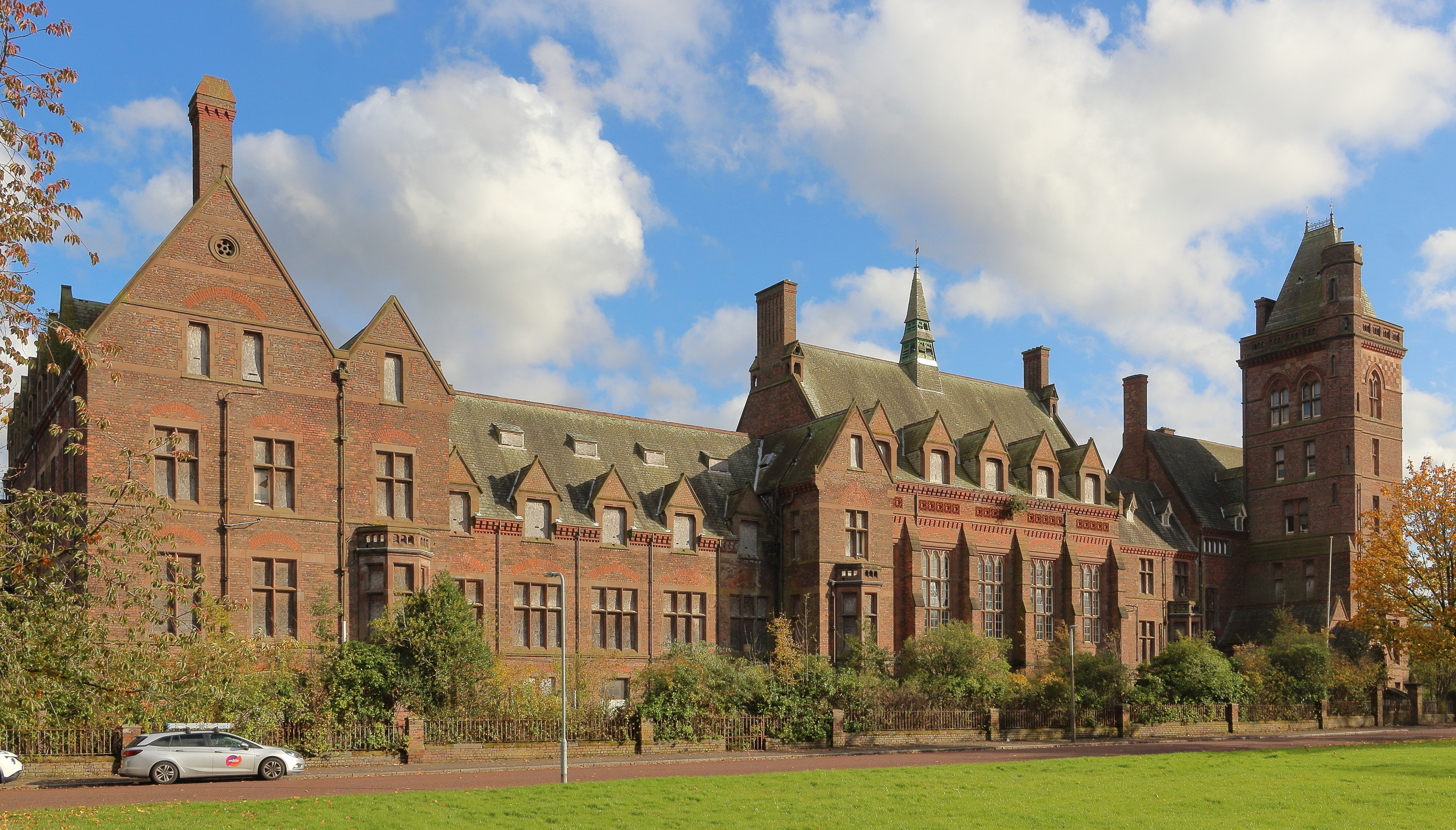
- Newsham Park Hospital

- Location within Merseyside

General information
- Location: Kensington, Liverpool, England, United Kingdom
- Coordinates: 53.421061°N 2.934755°W
- Completed: 1874
- Client: Liverpool Seamen's Orphan Institution Asylum

Design and construction
- Architect: Alfred Waterhouse

Newsham Park Hospital (often featured to as ‘Park Hospital’) is a former seaman’s hospital, orphanage and asylum.

Newsham Park Hospital is a grade II listed building in Liverpool, Merseyside, England (grid reference SJ379920). It now lies derelict but was previously a hospital prior to which it was the Liverpool Seamen's Orphan Institution.

== History ==
=== Foundation ===
Before 1869, there was no institution in Liverpool for the support and education of the orphans of British seamen. The first move to establish such an institution was made by a group of leading Liverpool ship-owners in 1868.

The sponsors of the project comprised a group of ship-owners and merchants who for some time had been concerned about how best to help the widows and families of deceased Merseyside men including those lost at sea. Members of the public were invited to attend a meeting at the Mercantile Marine Service Association Rooms on 16 December 1868, at which the resolution to found such an establishment was proposed by Ralph Brocklebank and Bryce Allan, both leading ship-owners and philanthropists. James Beazley, another leading ship-owner, was invited to be chairman of the committee to establish an orphanage.

It was James Beazley who, on 17 December 1868, wrote to nine of his colleagues offering to donate £500 to start a building fund if they would donate the same amount. There was an immediate response to this letter, and further donations were received following a more widespread public appeal. In 1869 an account was opened in Heywoods Bank, Brunswick Street. Within a few months, there was enough money for the General Committee to look around for a temporary home.

On 9 August 1869, the Liverpool Seamen's Orphan Institution opened in temporary rented accommodation in Duke Street, and by the end of that year, there were 46 boys and 14 girls in residence.

On 7 April 1870, Liverpool Town Council gave 7000 square yards (0.6 hectares) of land on the northeast side of Newsham Park to construct a Seaman's Orphan Institution. On 11 September 1871, the foundation stone of new building was laid by Mr. Ralph Brocklebank, the first President. The foundation stone of the chapel was laid on 1 August 1873 and the Liverpool Mercury carried the following report on 2 August entitled "Liverpool Seamen's Orphanage Institution: Laying the Foundation Stone of the Chapel."

The foundation stone of the chapel in connection with the orphanage, Newsham Park, was laid yesterday by Mr. C. MacIver. There was a large attendance of spectators, amongst those present being the mayor (Mr. E. Samuelson), Messrs. R. Brocklebank, J. Beazley, W. Langton, A. Brown, Clarke Aspinall, A. Balfour, H. J. Ward, Samuel Smith, Joseph Armstrong; the Revs. Canon Stewart, Canon Warr, R. H. Lundie, P. T. Forfar, G. Lord, A. Pitt, Drummond Anderson, and J. Turnbull; Captains Judkins, Lott, Inglis, Hains, Bell, &c. A number of the inmates (girls and boys) of the temporary home in Duke-Street, accompanied by the band of the institution, occupied seats in front of the platform, and their clean and healthy appearance bore testimony to the care taken of them.

Mr. James Beazley, the chairman of the executive committee, in opening the proceedings, said it was now about four years since an appeal was first made to the public for funds to build the institution from the tower of which the flag flew that day for the first time, and they hoped to open the building before the winter was over and admit 200 children; but it depended in a great measure upon the joiners of Liverpool, who for the last two or three months had kept these 200 poor starving children out of the building.

The building would cost £25.000, and it would be opened entirely free from debt. They were now about to erect alongside of it a chapel, which, apart from the higher considerations in favour of the scheme, would, he had no doubt, add very considerably to the funds of the institution by means of the offertory after the Sunday services.

The Mayor, at the request of Mr. Beazley, then took the chair, and a hymn having been sung by the orphans, and prayer offered' by the Rev. Canon Stewart, his worship said he felt, some few months ago, great delight in being able to congratulate those who interested themselves in this institution that their efforts had attained such success; and he was now equally delighted to find that they were not contented that the children should be housed, but that they felt that their religious education should also be fostered.

They had heard that, so far as the institution itself was concerned, all that was required had been received, but he had to make a strong appeal to the public on behalf of the building they were about to erect, and he was sufficiently liberal to hope that when they had erected a church on that side of the institution there would be others who would follow their example and build a chapel on the other side.

It was sad to think that 200 or 400? Children were kept out of the adjoining building in consequence of a misunderstanding between workmen and employer - it was indeed sad that the designs and intensions of benevolent men should be thus frustrated and the work of God impeded.

He did hope that when the work upon which they were now engaged was commenced they would not look back until the vane was put upon the spire.

Mr. MacIver then proceeded to lay the stone, using for the purpose a handsome silver trowel, with carved ivory handle, manufactured by Mr. Mayer, of Lord-street, and bearing the following inscription: - "Presented to Charles MacIver, Esq. - on the occasion of his laying the foundation stone of the chapel of the Liverpool Seamen's Orphan Institution, 1st August, 1873."

On 30 January 1874, there was held an informal opening of the North wing of the orphanage, As well as the children who moved from the temporary orphanage in Duke Street the committee also looked after children on an outdoor relief basis.

The institution was formally opened on 30 September 1874 by the Duke of Edinburgh, the "Sailor Prince", fourth son of Queen Victoria. The occasion was covered in The Liverpool Mercury on Monday 5 May 1879 as follows:

On Saturday afternoon, a large party of ladies and gentlemen assembled at the Seamen's Orphanage, Newsham Park, to witness the opening of a sanatorium, which has been erected at the sole cost (about £4000) of Mr. Ralph Brocklebank the president of the institution.

The Mayor and Mayoress (Mr. and Mrs. T. B. Royden) were present to perform the opening ceremony, and amongst the company who met them in the large dining hall were Mr. Ralph Brocklebank, Alderman Boyd, Mr Clarke Aspinall, Mr. R. Brocklebank, jun. Mr. James Beazley (the treasurer and chairman of the executive committee), Bishop Kelly, the Rev Drumond Anderson (the chaplain to the institution), Rev. Canon Warr, Captain Gough, C.B. Mr Joseph Armstrong, Mr P. Nelson. Mr. A. Turner, Mr. R. Allan, Mr G. Holt, Rev. William Lefroy, Rev. L. H. Lundie, Councillor Nicol and &c.

After the singing of a hymn by a number of the children, a procession was formed to the new building, the appointments and arrangements of which were minutely inspected by the visitors.

=== Further progress ===
As of June 1884, around 800 fatherless children were being supported by the orphanage, of which around half were living at the orphanage and an equal number were being supported at home, with their mothers. It was understood that the average annual cost to support one child in the orphanage was around £15 (equivalent to £2,100 in 2024), compared with £8 (equivalent to £1,100 in 2024) annually for those supported at home. The institution was financially supported entirely by voluntary donations. In May 1886, Queen Victoria visited the institution, and added her name to the list of patrons.

From the outset the education of the children was given top priority, and from 1892 the boys' school, and from 1898 the girls' school were administered strictly under government regulations, and the institution received a share of the Parliamentary Grant from the Education Department.

By 1899 there were 321 children in the orphanage, while 508 were receiving outdoor relief in the form of monetary grants and clothing. Children of all religious denominations were assisted, with preference given to orphans of British seamen connected with the Port of Liverpool. The scholastic and religious instruction was under the supervision of the Church of England Chaplain.

In July 1900 the Swimming Baths were opened and reported as follows by the Liverpool Mercury:

The Lord Mayor (Mr. Louise S Cohen) who was accompanied by the Lady Mayoress and Miss Cohen, yesterday performed in a very high temperature, the pleasing ceremony of opening the new swimming bath generously given to the Liverpool Seamen’s Orphanage, Newsham Park, by several staunch friends of the institution.

The bath, which is in every way up to date, save that a spray remains to be added, measures 60 by 26 feet, the floor bring graded so as to save waste of water, while at the same accommodating divers, novices, and polo goal keepers. Galleries at each end complete the structure, which is capitally lighted and ventilated by the architect (Mr Culshaw) having produced a bath which is the admiration of experts.

The Opening was brief and bright. Mr R. G. Allan (chairman of the institution) having conducted the guests to the chief gallery amid the cheers of boys and girls who with the teachers lined the bath, said the committee were adding to moral and intellectual training a more complete provision for physical exercise.

Some of the generous donors were - Sir Alfred Lewis Jones, Robert G Allan, James H Allan, Thomas Henry Ismay, Mr Justice Bigham, Arthur Earle, Sir William Bower Forwood, Ralph Brocklebank, Richard M Brocklebank, Thomas Brocklebank, Edward H Cookson, Mr George Holt, Sir Francis Henderson, Alfred David Jardine, William Johnston, James Lister, Alfred T Parker, Evelyn Parker, John Rankin, William H Shirley, Robert Singlehurst, Samuel Smith, Stephenson an old pupil, Sir Peter Walker, Mr and Mrs George Henry Warren, Mrs Mary Jane Titterington Legacy, Mr James Wood and Sir Robert Houston to name but a few.

=== The war years ===
The First World War brought problems, and by 1918 one thousand orphans were being assisted. Royal appreciation of the work was shown from time to time by visits to Newsham Park, and following a visit by Queen Mary and the Princess Royal in 1921 George V bestowed upon the institution the title "Royal" and granted it a Royal Charter of Incorporation.

In the inter-war years, the institution made continued progress.

During the Second World War, the children were evacuated to "Hill Bark", Frankby, Wirral, the country home of Mr E.B Royden, a devoted friend and committee member. Here the children remained and flourished throughout the war.

=== Post-war and closure ===
In 1946, preparations were made for a return to Newsham Park, but with the great expansion in the country's social service schemes, many surviving parents were understandably reluctant to place their children in the orphanage. This led to a gradual decline in the number of resident children. New laws prohibited children under 11 years of age from being educated at the same school as older children, and young children from living in an institutional school.

Despite Newsham Park's endowment, financial difficulties were increasing and there seemed little prospect of bridging the widening gap between income and expenditure. As a result, the orphanage was closed on 27 July 1949 while continuing to implement the objectives of the founders in providing means for the education and maintenance of the children of deceased British merchant navy seamen.

Places in various schools were found for those then being housed and educated at Newsham Park. Most were transferred to the Royal Merchant Navy School at Bearwood, fees, etc. being borne by Newsham Park.

The sale of the premises at Newsham Park to the Ministry of Health for use as a hospital realised £125,000 in 1951; the proceeds were forwarded to the Charity Commissioners for investment.

The committee continued to provide support to orphaned seamen's children on a non-resident basis, thus continuing to pursue the original objectives of the institution's founders, with special emphasis on education.

The work of the Institution in providing for the relief and education of the orphaned children of seamen continues today, and in 1969 the Institution celebrated its centenary.

==== Newsham Park Hospital ====
Newsham Park Hospital opened its doors in 1954. The hospital developed its own psychiatric department and received an influx of patients with severe mental problems.

The hospital officially stopped taking new patients in 1988, and by 1992 all remaining patients and staff were relocated.

==== Asylum ====
In 1992 with the closure of Rainhill Lunatic Asylum the inmates were moved to Newsham Park Hospital taking up 90% of its space. £1.6 million was spent on the hospital so it could house its new patients. There are still notices posted on boards in the School block and paperwork on the property that are dated 1996. All records of patients and staff have been closed for 100 years since 1997 when the building was finally vacated of patients and staff.

=== Post Hospital history ===
In 1997 the property was bought in auction by a property developer.

In 2004 a plan by its owners, Gateway Properties, to develop the building into flats was defeated by local regeneration campaigners, and in July 2007 the site was put up for sale.

==== Current status ====
The site is now owned by property developer Anglefarm Limited. Their associates Land Ecology Limited have submitted a planning application to "convert and refurbish part of the historic building into an events venue, including kitchen facilities, dining restaurant and bar, function and seminar facilities, external seating area and all associated works."
