= Everton Lock-Up =

Village lock-up in Everton, Liverpool, England

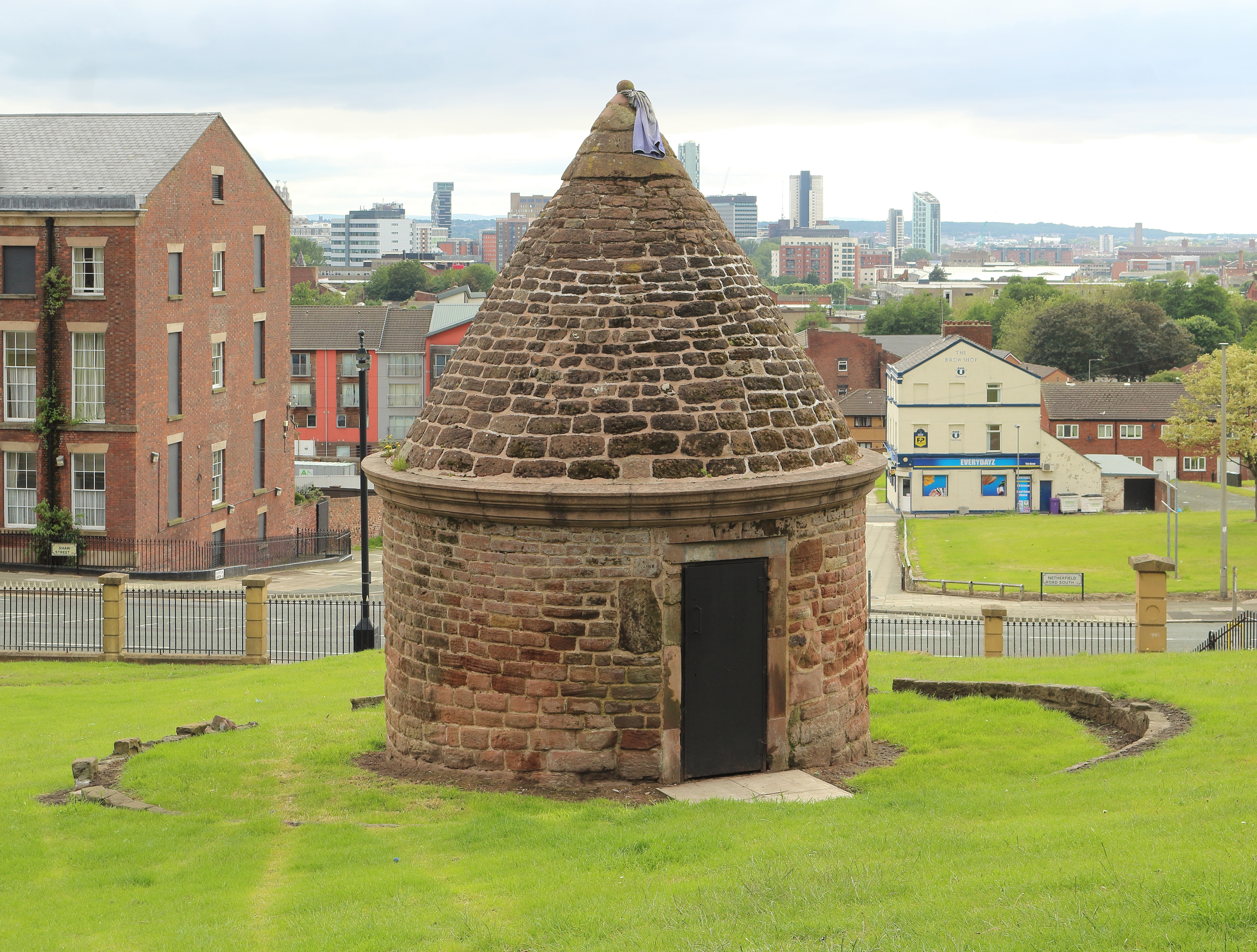
- Interactive map of the Everton Lock-Up area
- Alternative names: Prince Rupert's Tower; Prince Rupert's Castle; The Roundhouse; The Hut; Stewbum's Palace

General information
- Location: Everton, Brow Side Gardens, Liverpool, L3
- Coordinates: 53°25′2.64″N 2°58′11.66″W
- Inaugurated: 1787
- Renovated: 1997
- Renovation cost: £15,000
- Owner: Liverpool City Council

Dimensions
- Diameter: 8m

Technical details
- Floor count: 1

Listed Building – Grade II
- Official name: Former Lock Up
- Designated: 14 March 1975; 51 years ago
- Reference no.: 1062539

Everton Lock-Up, sometimes known as Prince Rupert's Tower or Prince Rupert's Castle, is a village lock-up located on Everton Brow in Everton, Liverpool. The 18th-century structure is one of two Georgian lock-ups that still survive in Liverpool; the other is in Wavertree. It is famous for being the centre-piece of the crest of Everton F.C.

The Grade II-listed building, which was opened in 1787, was originally an overnight holding place where local drunks and criminals were taken by parish constables. Prisoners would then be brought before local Justice of the peace for trial. Punishments would usually be similar to community service such as clearing ditches, unblocking drains or removing rubbish.

The Friends of Everton Park have included the lock-up in their Everton Park Heritage Trail with information boards displayed near the building.

Although one of its nicknames is Prince Rupert's Tower, the building was erected almost 150 years after the Royalist Army commanded by Prince Rupert camped in the area before the siege of Liverpool in 1644, during the First English Civil War. Historically Everton Brow is where Prince Rupert made preparations to attack the Parliamentarian garrison holding Liverpool Castle. As commander of the Royalist cavalry of Charles I, he is said to have looked down at the castle and dismissed it with the words: "It is a crow’s nest that any party of schoolboys could take!". It eventually fell after a week of heavy fighting and the loss of 1,500 of his men.

== Use by Everton F.C. ==
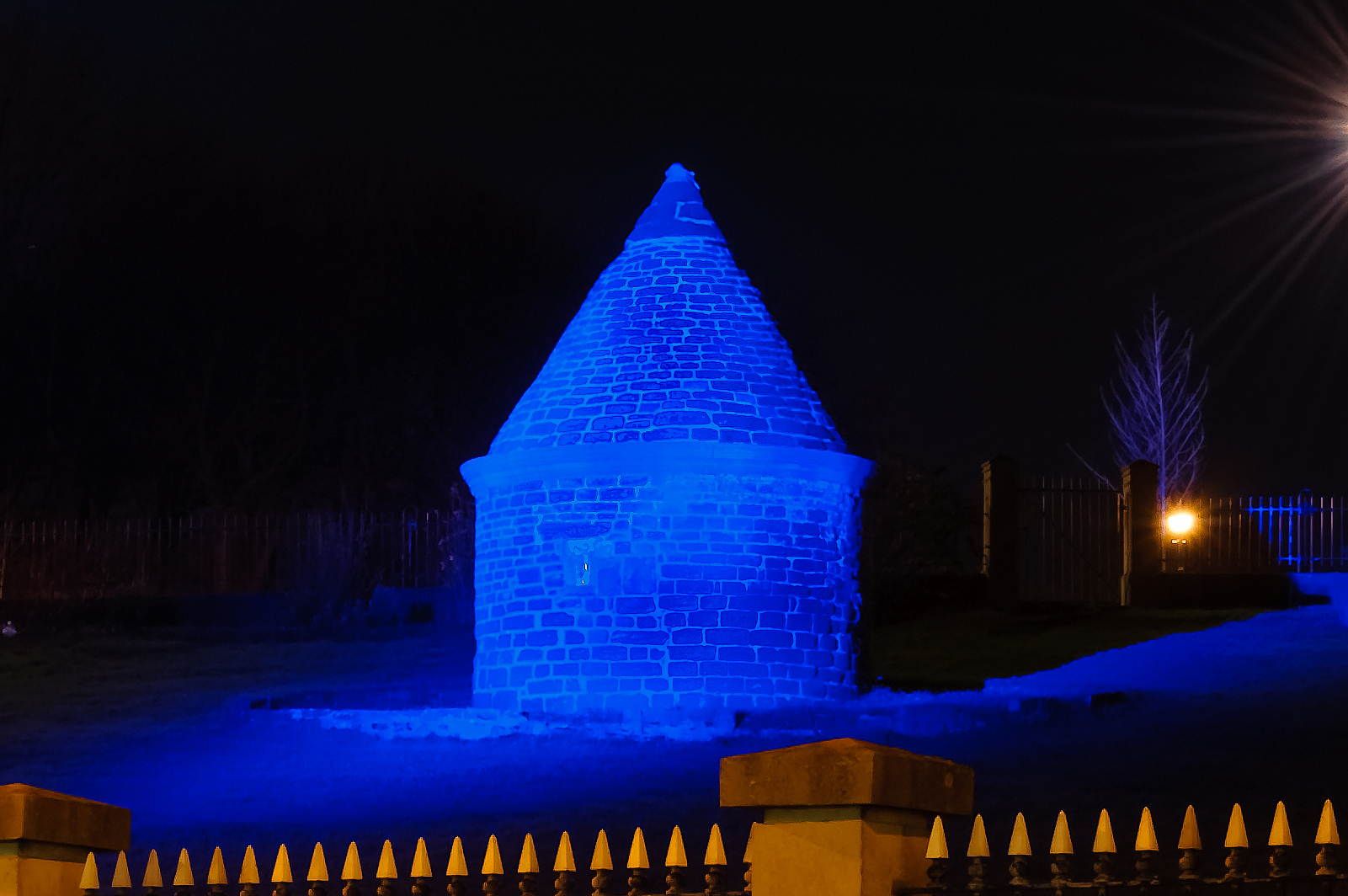
The Everton Lock-Up illuminated blue at night

A depiction of the Everton Lock-Up has appeared on the crest of professional football club Everton F.C. since 1938. In 2003, a plaque was added to the building stating the importance of its sporting association. In May 1997, Everton gave £15,000 for renovating the structure and in February 2014 Everton Lock-Up was permanently illuminated blue.
