= Newsham Park =

Park in Liverpool, UK

Coordinates: 53.419°N 2.940°W

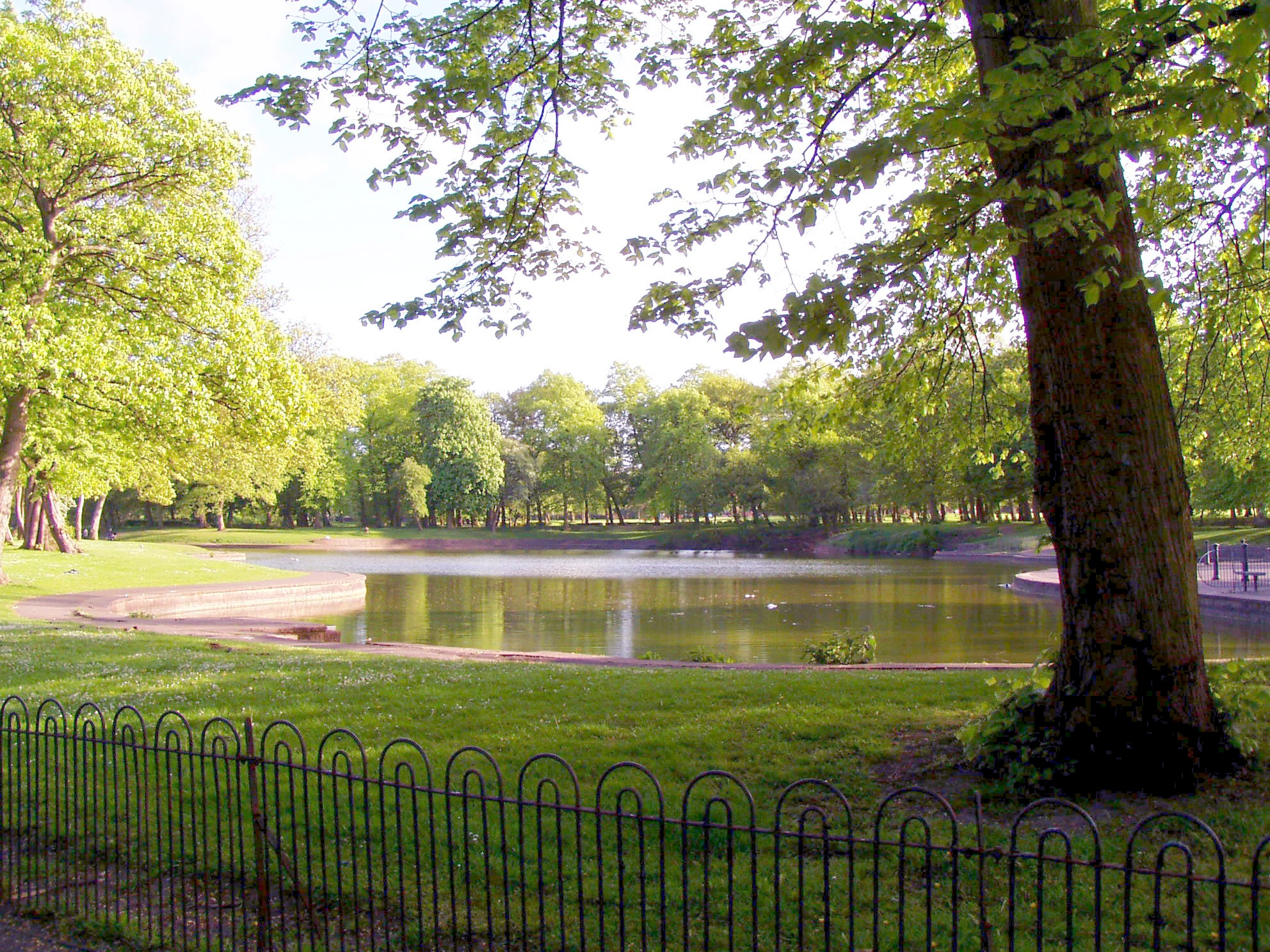
- Interactive map of Newsham Park
- Type: Public Park
- Location: Liverpool, England, UK
- Area: 121 acres (490,000 m^{2})
- Created: 1868
- Operator: Liverpool City Council
- Status: Open all year

Newsham Park (locally /njuːʒəm/) in Liverpool, England is a 121 acres (49 ha) Victorian public park. To the east of it is the Canada Dock branch railway line, and to the north is West Derby Road. The park is protected as a Grade II* listed site.

== History ==
The park was opened in 1868. In 1877, it was the site for that year's Royal Agricultural Show.

Newsham Park was the first individual work of the landscape architect Edward Kemp, an understudy of Joseph Paxton who was responsible for the grounds at Chatsworth House and the design of Birkenhead Park, a city park that became a working model for the creation of Manhattan's Central Park.

== Facilities and attractions ==
- The Grade II listed Newsham House, where Queen Victoria once stayed. Now used as Judges' lodgings.
- The Grade II listed Seamen's Orphan Institution.
- Fishing lakes with roach, carp and tench (registration permit required).
- Children's play area
- Lakeview Kiosk (open 9 am-5 pm)

== Description ==
The park is part of a set of Victorian public parks within Liverpool, including Stanley Park, Walton Hall Park, Princes Park and the largest of the group, Sefton Park.

It is built on land purchased by the Liverpool Corporation from the Molyneux Estate. The development of the park was funded by the sale of plots for the construction of housing. Consequently, the park is fringed by Victorian housing, some of which is currently empty and derelict. The area has been awarded Conservation Area status, a legal protection against development to protect and preserve the Victorian architecture.

The park contains two large lakes, the smaller of which hosts the sailing of model boats. The larger lake historically offered rowing boats for hire, but they are no longer present. It is currently used for fishing. The lake has a historical reputation linked to the matrons of the former orphanage, who allegedly employed extreme disciplinary measures on unruly children. According to accounts, they would submerge the children's heads in the water until the brink of drowning, only releasing them when they were in a state of distress and pleading for the practice to cease. It is now reported that visitors have heard the sounds of children screaming near the lake during the night, along with the bubbling of the water.

== Buildings ==
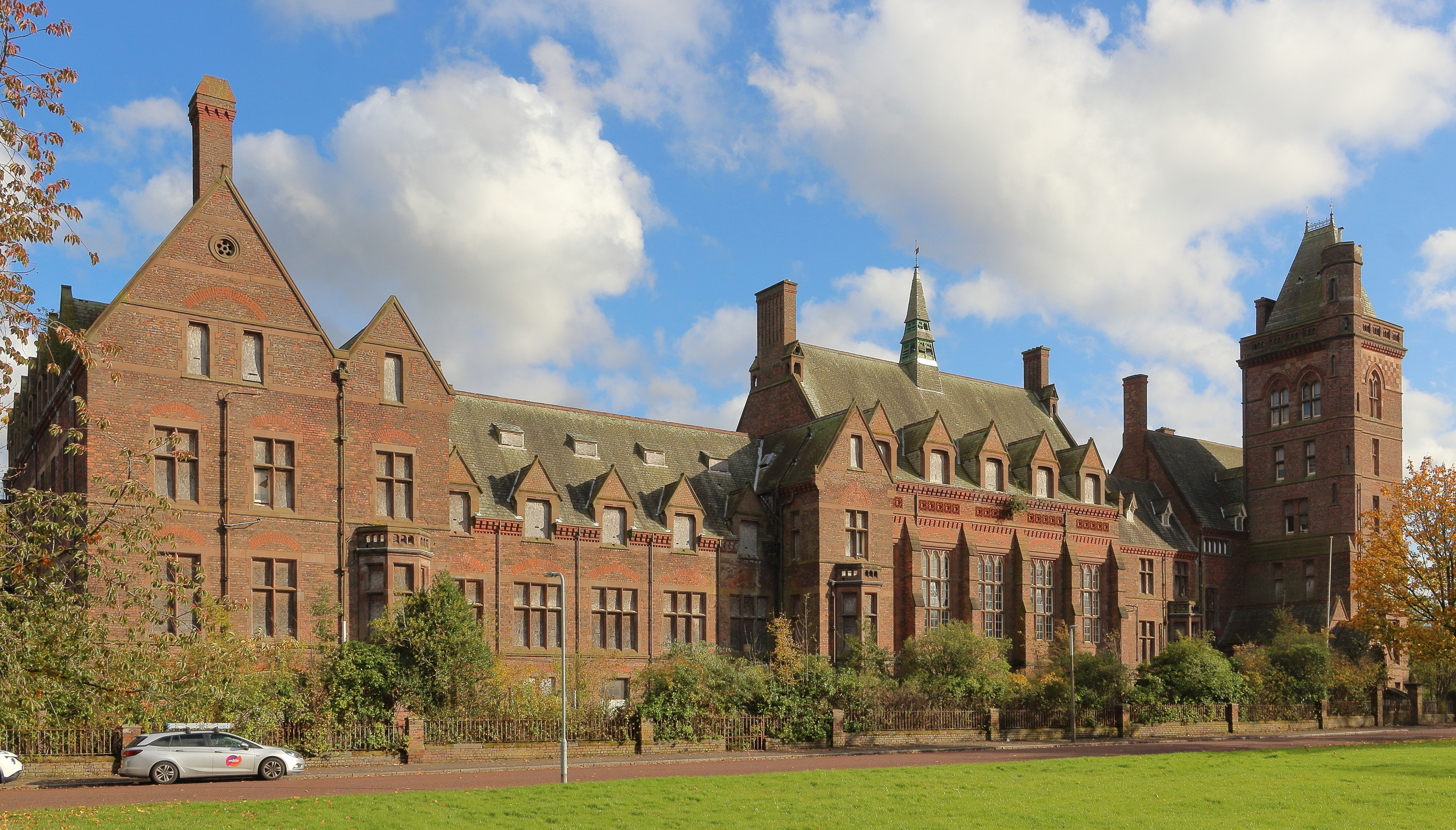
Seaman's Orphanage

The park also has several important buildings, including the Grade II listed Seaman's Orphanage — a building later converted to Newsham Park Hospital and subsequently earmarked for development as luxury apartments, which never happened. most notably due to the extensive sightings of supernatural activity. Another building within the park is Newsham House, which is the residence for judges attending the Crown Court in Liverpool and was visited by Queen Victoria.

In 2004 work commenced on the Academy of St. Francis of Assisi, a secondary school (11–16) under the UK Government's City Academy programme. The school is a modern four-storey building at the western end of the park, and its contemporary style caused some friction with local residents who felt that it was at odds with the park's Conservation Area status.

The now-closed Stanley railway station was located in the south east corner and the similarly closed Tue Brook railway station to the north east.

== Present day ==
The park has been placed by English Heritage on its Heritage at Risk list because of its "poor" condition and because the trend is towards deterioration.

On the 30 July 2012 Newsham Park's lakes were temporarily closed due to potentially toxic blue-green algae. They were later reopened.

In 2012 a Kiosk was built, which opens from 9 am to 5 pm.
