= Everton Road drill hall =

Military building in Liverpool, England

- Liverpool
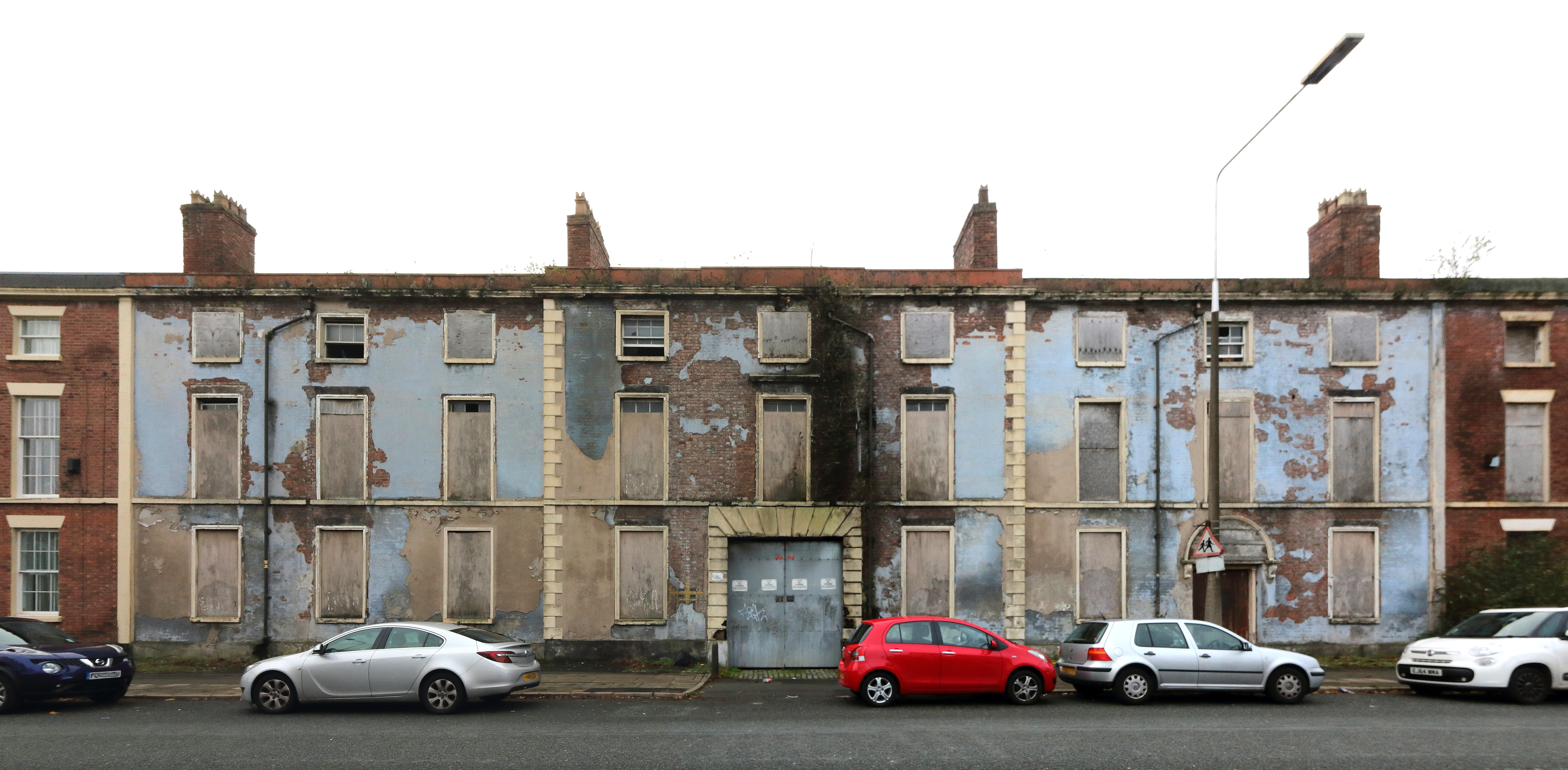
- The frontage of the Everton Road drill hall, Liverpool

Site information
- Type: Drill hall

Location
- Location in Merseyside
- Coordinates: 53.41599°N 2.96566°W

Site history
- Built: 1884
- Built for: War Office
- In use: 1884 – 1967

The Everton Road drill hall is a former military installation in Liverpool.

== History ==
The building was designed as a drill hall for the 19th Lancashire Rifle Volunteers by connecting three double-fronted Georgian houses in 1884. This unit went on to become the 6th Volunteer Battalion, the King's (Liverpool Regiment) in 1888, and the 9th Battalion, the King's (Liverpool Regiment) in 1908 (part of the West Lancashire Division. The battalion was mobilised at the drill hall in August 1914 before being deployed to the Western Front. It has been occupied by the Red Triangle Karate Club since around 1990.

== See also ==
- Grade II listed buildings in Liverpool-L6
