= Frank William Ramsay =

British Army general

Major-General Frank William Ramsay CB CMG DSO
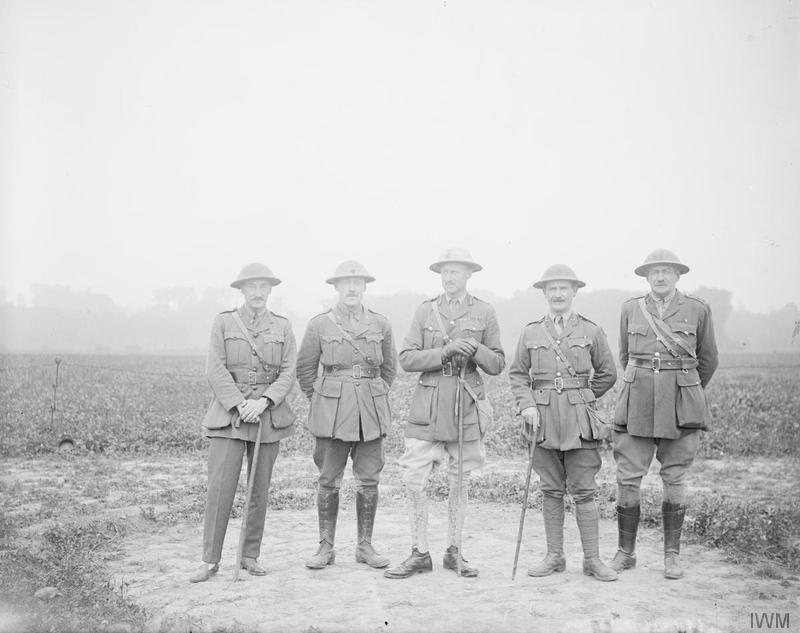
- Ramsay (centre) with officers in 1917
- Born: 10 December 1875
- Died: 1 October 1954 (aged 78); Weymouth, Dorset, UK
- Military career
- Allegiance: United Kingdom
- Branch: British Army
- Rank: Major-General
- Commands: 48th Brigade; 58th Division (1918–1919); 6th Infantry Brigade (1919–1923)
- Conflicts: World War I: Battle of Messines
- Awards: Distinguished Service Order

Major-General Frank William Ramsay CB CMG DSO (10 December 1875 – 1 October 1954) was a senior British Army officer in the First World War.

== Early life ==
Ramsay was educated at Dean Close School in Cheltenham.

== Military career ==
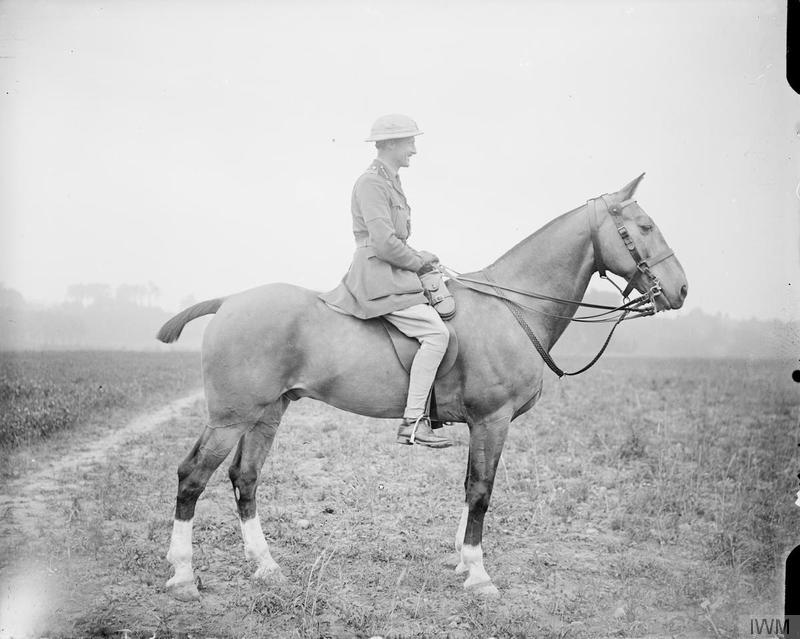
Ramsay on horseback in 1917

Ramsay transferred from the Northumberland Militia Artillery into the Middlesex Regiment on 15 May 1897.

He served with the mounted infantry before the First World War, being seconded to serve with them on 21 November 1907. He was promoted from supernumerary captain to captain on 26 January 1903.

In the war, on 1 September 1914, he was promoted to major. He served as commander of the 16th (Irish) Division's 48th Infantry Brigade in January 1916 and was promoted to the temporary rank of brigadier general whilst employed in this role. He participated in the Battle of Messines in 1917 and, after being promoted to temporary major general on 14 June 1918, went on to be general officer commanding (GOC) of the 58th (2/1st London) Division.

In January 1919 he was promoted to brevet colonel.

In 1925 he took command over a brigade of the Quetta Division, which he commanded with the temporary rank of colonel commandant while employed. On 1 September 1926 he was assigned to command the 15th Indian Infantry Brigade. He retired from the army in 1929. Later he lived in Holbrook Hall, Sudbury.

Ramsey was awarded the Distinguished Service Order (DSO) in 1916 and appointed Companion of the Order of St Michael and St George (CMG) in 1917 and Companion of the Order of the Bath (CB) in 1919.

== Works ==
- "Polo Pony Training with Some Hints on the Game" London and Portsmouth, Gale & Polden (1928)

Military offices
| Preceded by Nevill Smyth | GOC 58th (2/1st London) Division; 1918–1919 | Succeeded by Post disbanded |
