= William Gawin Herdman =

English painter

- Born: 1805
- Died: 1882 (aged 76–77)
- Occupations: Painter and author

William Gawin Herdman (also known as W. G. Herdman; 1805–1882) was a British writer and painter, known for his scenes in the Liverpool area of England.

== Art ==
Herdman was a self-taught painter who started sketching in his early teens, documenting the city of Liverpool, making notes about how the city and its buildings were changing as the city grew. Herdman painted around 2,000 watercolours of Liverpool scenes which were included in the book, Herdman’s Liverpool which appeared in several editions after his death in 1882.

Herdman is best known as a landscape painter, typically of scenes around Liverpool. Herdman exhibited landscapes at the Royal Academy from 1834 to 1861. He joined the Liverpool Academy of Arts in 1836. In 1857 he left the Liverpool Academy over their annual award to Sir John Everett Millais for his The Blind Girl. Herdman then established the rival Institution of Fine Arts. The local academies were run along similar lines to the Royal Academy, holding exhibitions of the work of local artists alongside that of leading artists of the day including John Landseer and his son Sir Edwin Henry Landseer, as well as Ford Madox Brown, William Holman Hunt, and Millais. Because of conflicts within the Artist Community, both Academies closed by 1870.

Herdman was a teacher and a successful commercial artist. He took commissions and after completing a series of paintings of scenes around Liverpool, which were also used to illustrate Herdman's books. The Pictorial Relics of Ancient Liverpool contained 62 drawings on 49 plates, which he published in 1843 and 1856. Other publications include A Treatise of Curvilinear Perspectives and its applications to Art published in 1854 and Thoughts on Speculative cosmology and the principles of Art published in 1870.

== Personal life ==
Herdman had 11 sons and five daughters; some were successful artists in their own right: William, William Patrick, John Innes, and Stanley. At least one of his daughters was an art teacher. Herdman's son, also called William, was a very successful painter. Watercolors signed in full or with the initials WGH are by Herdman senior. Those signed “William Herdman” are by his son.

Herdman was appointed secretary of the Liverpool Society but found himself at odds with the membership. Herdman painted from real life, not the imaginary world of the Pre-Raphaelites, and he objected when the Pre-Raphaelites were continually awarded the academy's annual prizes. Herdman resigned in 1857 and the following year, he founded the Liverpool Society of Fine Arts. The rivalry between the two institutions resulted in the closure of both, the Society in 1862 and the academy in 1865.

Herdman lived at 41 Domingo Vale, Everton. Herdman's obituary is in the Liverpool Mercury, Saturday 1 April 1882.

Colin Simpson, who is curator of the Williamson Art Gallery in Birkenhead, said Herdman “was known to take the Mersey ferry, walk as far as he could in half an hour or so and then sketch what he saw. Views of New Brighton and Eastham were favourites” of Herdman, as was one particular hostelry in Rock Ferry has about 10 versions.

A wide selection of Herdman work is stored in the William Brown Library and Museum in Liverpool.
