= List of battalions of the King's Regiment (Liverpool) =

This is a list of battalions of the King's Regiment (Liverpool), which existed as an infantry regiment of the British Army from 1881 to 1958.

== Original composition ==
When the 8th (The King's) Regiment of Foot became The King's (Liverpool Regiment) in 1881 under the Cardwell-Childers reforms of the British Armed Forces, eight pre-existent militia and volunteer battalions of Lancashire and the Isle of Man were integrated into the structure of the King's Regiment. Volunteer battalions had been created in reaction to a perceived threat of invasion by France in the late 1850s. Organised as "rifle volunteer corps", they were independent of the British Army and composed primarily of the middle class. The only change to the regiment's structure during the period of 1881-1908 occurred during the Second Boer War. During the conflict, the regiment formed two additional regular battalions in Ireland in 1900, which required the militia to be renumbered the 5th and 6th battalions to accommodate them. The new battalions disbanded in 1901 and the militia reverted to their original designations.

Battalion	Formed	Formerly
Regular
1st	1685	
2nd	1857	
Militia
3rd (Militia)	1797	1st Battalion, 2nd Royal Lancashire Militia (The Duke of Lancaster's Own Rifles)
4th (Militia)	1854	2nd Battalion, 2nd Royal Lancashire Militia (The Duke of Lancaster's Own Rifles)
Volunteers
1st Volunteer	1859	1st Lancashire Rifle Volunteer Corps
2nd Volunteer	1859	5th (The Liverpool Rifle Volunteer Brigade) Lancashire Rifle Volunteer Corps
3rd Volunteer	1859	13th Lancashire Rifle Volunteer Corps
4th Volunteer	1860	15th Lancashire Rifle Volunteer Corps
5th (Irish) Volunteer	1860	18th (Liverpool Irish) Lancashire Rifle Volunteers Corps
6th Volunteer	1861	19th (Liverpool Press Guard) Lancashire Rifle Volunteer Corps
7th (Isle of Man) Volunteer	1860	1st Isle of Man Rifle Volunteers

== Reorganisation ==
The Territorial Force (later Territorial Army) was formed in 1908, which the volunteer battalions joined, while the militia battalions transferred to the "Special Reserve". All volunteer battalions were renumbered to create a single sequential order. Uniquely, the 7th (Isle of Man) Battalion did not join the Territorial Force, instead remaining a "volunteer" battalion.

Battalion	Formerly
5th	1st Volunteer Battalion
6th (Rifle)	2nd Volunteer Battalion
7th	Amalgamation of 3rd and 4th Volunteer Battalions
8th (Irish)	5th (Irish) Volunteer Battalion
9th	6th Volunteer Battalion
10th (Liverpool Scottish)	8th (Scottish) Volunteer Battalion (formed 1900)

== First World War ==
The King's Regiment fielded 49 battalions and lost 13,795 officers and other ranks during the course of the war. The regiment's territorial components formed duplicate second and third line battalions. As an example, the three-line battalions of the 5th King's were numbered as the 1/5th, 2/5th, and 3/5th respectively. Many battalions of the King's were formed as part of Secretary of State for War Lord Kitchener's appeal for an initial 100,000 men volunteers in 1914. They were referred to as the New Army or Kitchener's Army. The 17th to 20th King's, New Army "Service" battalions, were referred to as the Liverpool "Pals" because they were predominantly composed of colleagues. The Volunteer Training Corps were raised with overage or reserved occupation men early in the war, and were initially self-organised into many small corps, with a wide variety of names. Recognition of the corps by the authorities brought regulation and as the war continued the small corps were formed into battalion sized units of the county Volunteer Regiment. In 1918 these were linked to county regiments.

Battalion	Formed	Served	Fate
Regular
1st	1685	Western Front	
2nd	1857	India (NWF), Afghanistan	
Special Reserve
3rd (Reserve)		Britain, Ireland	
4th (Extra Reserve)		Western Front	
Territorial Force
1/5th	1859	Western Front	See Inter-War
1/6th (Rifle)	1859	Western Front	See Inter-War
1/7th	1859/1860	Western Front	See Inter-War
1/8th (Irish)	1860	Western Front	See Inter-War
1/9th	1861	Western Front	See Inter-War
1/10th (Scottish)	1900	Western Front	See Inter-War
2/5th	Liverpool, September 1914	Western Front	Disbanded 1 February 1918
2/6th (Rifle)	Liverpool, September 1914	Western Front	Disbanded May 1919
2/7th	Bootle, October 1914	Western Front	Disbanded 15 May 1919
2/8th (Irish)	Liverpool, October 1914	Western Front	Absorbed by 1/8th King's on 31 January 1918
2/9th Battalion	Liverpool, October 1914	Western Front	Absorbed by 1/9th King's in February 1918
2/10 (Scottish)	Liverpool, October 1914	Western Front	Absorbed by 1/10th King's in April 1918
3/5th	Liverpool, May 1915	Britain	Transferred to West Lancashire Reserve Brigade (WLRB), 1916
3/6th (Rifle)	Liverpool, May 1915	Britain	Transferred to WLRB, 1916
3/7th	Liverpool, May 1915	Britain	Transferred to WLRB, 1916
3/8th (Irish)	Liverpool, May 1915	Britain	Transferred WLRB, 1916
3/9th	Liverpool, May 1915	Britain	Transferred to WLRB, 1916
3/10th (Scottish)	Liverpool, May 1915	Britain	Transferred to WLRB, 1916
25th (Garrison)	Sheringham, 1 January 1917, from 43rd Provisional Battalion (Territorial Force)	Western Front	Disbanded March 1920
26th	Essex, 1 January 1917, from 44th Provisional Battalion (Territorial Force)	Britain	Disbanded March 1918
New Army
11th (Service)	Seaforth, 23 August 1914	Western Front	Absorbed by 15th Loyal North Lancashire Regiment, August 1918
12th (Service)	Seaforth, September 1914	Western Front	Disbanded June 1919
13th (Service)	Seaforth, October 1914	Western Front	Disbanded October 1919
14th (Service)	Seaforth, October 1914	Western Front, Salonika	Absorbed by the 18th in August 1918
15th (Reserve)	Formby, November 1914	Britain	Became the 49th Training Reserve Battalion, September 1916
16th (Reserve)	Hoylake, December 1914	Britain	Absorbed by TR battalions of 11th Reserve Brigade, September 1916
17th (Service)	Liverpool, 29 August 1914	Western Front, Russia	Disbanded September 1919
18th (Service)	Liverpool, 29 August 1914	Western Front	Disbanded May 1919
19th (Service)	Liverpool, 29 August 1914	Western Front	Absorbed by the 14th King's, 13 August 1918
20th (Service)	Liverpool, 16 October 1914	Western Front	Disbanded February 1918
21st (Reserve)	Knowsley Park, August 1915	Britain	Became 67th Training Reserve Battalion in 16th Reserve Brigade, September 1916
22nd (Reserve)	Knowsley Park, August 1915	Britain	Became 68th Training Reserve Battalion, 16th Reserve Brigade, September 1916
Others
7th (Isle of Man) Volunteer Battalion	1860	Britain, Salonika (Service Company)	Disbanded March 1920
23rd (Works)	Prescot, May 1916	Britain	Became the 1st Labour Battalion, March 1917
24th (Works)	Birmingham, June 1916	Britain	Possibly redesignated as the 27th; became the 2nd Labour Battalion, April 1917
27th (Home Service)	Sidestrand, 27 April 1918	Britain	Disbanded March 1919
28th (Home Service)	Clacton-on-Sea, June 1918	Britain	Absorbed by 17th King's, July 1918
29th (Service)	Liverpool, May 1919	France & Flanders	Disbanded August 1920
30th (Service)	May 1919	France & Flanders	Disbanded August 1920
1st Garrison	Liverpool, August 1915	Egypt	Disbanded September 1919
2nd Garrison	Pembroke Dock, November 1915	Egypt, Salonika	Disbanded January 1920
3rd (Home Service) Garrison	Pembroke Dock, April 1916	Britain	Became the 3rd Royal Defence Corps, August 1917
1st Dock	Liverpool, August 1915	Liverpool	Disbanded November 1917
2nd Dock	Liverpool, August 1915	Liverpool	Disbanded by 1918
51st (Graduated)	Fermoy, 27 October 1917, formerly 20th Welch Regiment	Ireland, East Anglia	Disbanded November 1919
52nd (Graduated)	Herringfleet, 27 October 1917, formerly 12th East Lancashire Regiment	East Anglia	Converted to Service battalion February 1919; disbanded February 1920
53rd (Young Soldier)	Prees Heath Camp, 27 October 1917, formerly 21st Lancashire Fusiliers	Kinmel Camp, Rhyl	Disbanded June 1919
Volunteer Training Corps
5th Battalion Lancashire Volunteer Regiment later the 1st Volunteer Battalion, King's (Liverpool) Regiment		Liverpool	Disbanded post war
6th Battalion Lancashire Volunteer Regiment later the 2nd Volunteer Battalion, King's (Liverpool) Regiment		Liverpool	Disbanded post war
6th Battalion Lancashire Volunteer Regiment later the 3rd Volunteer Battalion, King's (Liverpool) Regiment		Liverpool	Disbanded post war

== Inter-War ==
By 1922, all of the regiment's war-raised battalions had disbanded. The King's Regiment did not, however, return to its original peacetime size; it lost the 8th (Liverpool Irish) and 9th battalions shortly after the war ended. The Special Reserve reverted to its militia designation in 1921, then to the Supplementary Reserve in 1924; however, its battalions were effectively placed in 'suspended animation'. As World War II approached, the Territorial Army was reorganised in the mid-1930s, many of its infantry battalions were converted to other roles, especially anti-aircraft.

Battalion	Fate
5th	Retained, though it became a "line infantry" battalion when its rifle distinctions were relinquished in 1937
6th (Rifle)	Transferred to the Royal Engineers, becoming the 38th (The King's Regiment) Anti-Aircraft Battalion, 1936, later 38th (The King's Regiment) Searchlight Regiment, Royal Artillery
7th	Became the 40th (The King's) Regiment, Royal Tank Corps, July 1938
8th (Irish)	Disbanded 31 March 1922
9th	Absorbed by the Royal Engineers, 1920
10th (Liverpool Scottish)	Became a battalion of the Queen's Own Cameron Highlanders, retaining its Liverpool Scottish designation, 1937.

== Second World War ==
The King's expansion during the Second World War was modest compared to 1914-1918. Existing battalions formed duplicates as in the First World War, while National Defence Companies were combined to create a new "Home Defence" battalion. In addition to this, 16 battalions of the Home Guard were affiliated to the regiment. These wore the 'WL' designation for West Lancashire, the remaining 7 wearing this patch were cap-badged to another regiment. By 1944 one anti-aircraft battery and three rocket batteries (Z Battery) were also part of the regiment, making up most of the 24th Anti-Aircraft Regiment (Home Guard). Due to the daytime (or shift working) occupations of the men the batteries required eight times the manpower of an equivalent regular unit.

Battalion	Formed	Served	Fate
Regular
1st	1685	India, Burma, Chindits	Became the 15th Battalion, Parachute Regiment (United Kingdom), 1945
2nd	1857	North Africa, Italy, Greece	See post-World War II
Supplementary Reserve
3rd		Britain	See Post-World War II
4th		Britain	See Post-World War II
Territorial Army
5th	1859	Britain, France, Germany	See Post-World War II
8th (Irish)	Authorised March 1939; reformed October 1939	Britain, France	Effectively disbanded in August 1944; officially placed in "suspended animation" on 22 November 1944; reconstituted on 1 January 1947 as 626th Heavy Anti-Aircraft Regiment, RA
9th	Authorised March 1939; reformed May 1939 as duplicate of 5th King's	Britain	Placed in "suspended animation" on 21 March 1946; re-amalgamated with 5th King's 1 January 1947
10th (Home Defence)	December 1939, from National Defence Companies	Britain	Redesignated 30th (Home Defence) Battalion November 1940
11th	July 1940	Britain	Became the 152nd Regiment Royal Armoured Corps, November 1941
12th	July 1940	Britain	Transferred to the Royal Artillery, November 1941 and became 101st Light Anti-Aircraft Regiment, Royal Artillery
13th	June 1940	India, Burma (Chindits)	Disbanded 1945
14th	Isle of Man, October 1940, from 50th (Holding) Bn	Isle of Man	Transferred to the Royal Artillery, February 1942 and became 184th Field Regiment, Royal Artillery
15th (Home Defence)	Formerly the 2/10th King's, September 1940	Britain	Disbanded 1941
30th (Home Defence)	Formerly the 10th King's	Britain	Disbanded March 1943
Others
50th (Holding)	Liverpool, 1939	Britain	Became 14th Bn October 1940
70th (Young Soldiers)	Formed from YS companies of 10th (HD) Bn King's and 8th (HD) Bn Cheshire Regiment, September 1940	Britain	Disbanded September 1943

Home Guard
Battalion	Headquarters	Formation Sign (dark blue on khaki)	Battalion	Headquarters	Formation Sign (dark blue on khaki)
71st	Ormskirk	WL 71	72nd	Crosby	WL 72
73rd	Maghull	WL 73	74th	Southport	WL 74
77th	Bootle	WL 77	82nd (Liverpool)	Toxteth	WL 82
83rd (Liverpool)	Anfield	WL 83	84th (Liverpool)	Woolton	WL 84
85th (Liverpool)	Chidwall	WL 85	86th (Liverpool)	Stoneycroft	WL 86
87th (Liverpool)	Aigburth	WL 87	88th (Liverpool)	Bootle	WL 88
89th	Liverpool	WL 89	90th (Liverpool Corporation Passenger Transport)	Liverpool	WL 90
91st (L.M.S.)	Liverpool	WL 91	92nd (G.P.O. 20)	Liverpool	WL 92
Home Guard Anti-Aircraft units
Formation Sign (dark blue on khaki)	Headquarters or Location	AA Formation and Designation	Formation Sign (dark blue on khaki)	Headquarters or Location	AA Formation and Designation
WL 171	Liverpool	171st Battery, 24th Anti-Aircraft Regiment (Home Guard) (HAA)	WL 101	Bootle	172nd Battery, 24th Anti-Aircraft Regiment (Home Guard) (Z battery)
WL 102	Liverpool	201st Battery, 24th Anti-Aircraft Regiment (Home Guard) (Z battery)	WL 103	Liverpool	202nd Battery, 24th Anti-Aircraft Regiment (Home Guard) (Z battery)

== Post-World War II ==
In the immediate post-war period, the army was significantly reduced: nearly all infantry regiments had their first and second battalions amalgamated and the Supplementary Reserve disbanded. A defence review by Duncan Sandys in 1957 decided that the King's would be amalgamated with the Manchester Regiment, to form the King's Regiment (Manchester and Liverpool). They united as the 1st Battalion on 1 September 1958.

Battalion	Fate
1st	Amalgamated with 1st Manchesters to form the 1st Battalion, The King's Regiment (Manchester and Liverpool), September 1958
2nd	Amalgamated with 1st King's, September 1948
3rd	Disbanded 1953
4th	Disbanded 1953
5th	Retained its identity until 1967, when it became a company of the Lancastrian Volunteers

== External sources ==
- King's at The Long, Long Trail. Accessed 29 January 2021
- Regiments.org. Archive site accessed 17 November 2005
- The Regimental Warpath (1914-1918). Archive site accessed 17 November 2005
