= Henry James Knight =

Recipient of the Victoria Cross (1878–1955)

Henry James Knight VC
- Born: James Huntley Knight; 5 November 1878; Yeovil, Somerset
- Died: 24 November 1955 (aged 77); Anderson, Dorset
- Burial place: Bournemouth Crematorium (Memorial at Millborne St Andrew Church, Dorset)
- Military career
- Allegiance: United Kingdom
- Branch: British Army
- Service years: 1892–1911, 1914–1917
- Rank: Captain
- Units: The King's (Liverpool) Regiment; Royal Fusiliers; Manchester Regiment
- Conflicts: Second Boer War; World War I
- Awards: Victoria Cross

Henry James Knight VC (Born James Huntley Knight, 5 November 1878 – 24 November 1955) was an English recipient of the Victoria Cross, the highest and most prestigious award for gallantry in the face of the enemy that can be awarded to British and Commonwealth forces.

== Details ==
Born James Huntley Knight in Yeovil, Somerset he was 21 years old, and a corporal in the 1st Battalion, The King's (Liverpool) Regiment, British Army during the Second Boer War when the following deed took place for which he was awarded the VC. The full citation was published in the London Gazette of 4 January 1901 and reads:

War Office, January 4, 1901.

THE Queen has been graciously pleased to signify Her intention to confer the decoration of the Victoria Cross on the undermentioned Non-Commissioned Officer, whose claims have been submitted for Her Majesty's approval, for his conspicuous bravery during the operations near Van Wyk's Vlei, as stated against his name :—

1st Battalion Liverpool Regiment. No. 1 Company, 4th Division Mounted Infantry

Corporal H. J. Knight

On the 21st August, during the operations near Van Wyk's Vlei, Corporal Knight was posted in some rocks with four men covering the right rear of a detachment of the same Company who, under Captain Ewart, were holding the right of the line.

The enemy, about 50 strong, attacked Captain Ewart's right and almost surrounded, at short range, Corporal Knight's small party. That Non-Commissioned Officer held his ground, directing his party to retire one by one to better cover, where he maintained his position for nearly an hour, covering the withdrawal of Captain Ewart's force, and losing two of his four men.

He then retired, bringing with him two wounded men. One of these he left in a place of safety, the other he carried himself for nearly two miles.

The party were hotly engaged during the whole time.

Knight stayed in South Africa until after the war ended in June 1902, returning home on the SS Carisbrook Castle which arrived in Southampton in early December that year.

== Further information ==
He later served in the First World War, receiving a commission as a temporary lieutenant in the 20th (Service) Battalion (5th City), Manchester Regiment in January 1915. He later achieved the rank of captain.

He died in November 1955, at the age of 77.

His VC is displayed at the Museum of the King's Regiment, Liverpool, England.
