= Jack Thomas Counter =

English Victoria Cross recipient (1898-1970)

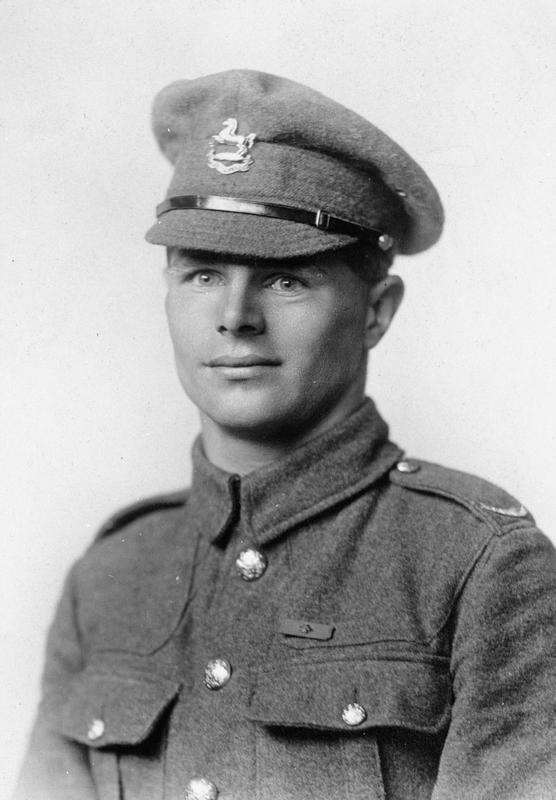
- Born: 3 November 1898; Blandford Forum, Dorset
- Died: 16 September 1970 (aged 71); Blandford Forum
- Military career
- Allegiance: United Kingdom
- Branch: British Army
- Rank: Corporal
- Units: King's Regiment (Liverpool)
- Conflicts: World War I
- Awards: Victoria Cross
- Other work: Postman

Jack Thomas Counter VC (3 November 1898 – 16 September 1970) was an English recipient of the Victoria Cross, the highest and most prestigious award for gallantry in the face of the enemy that can be awarded to British and Commonwealth forces.

He was 19 years old, and a private in the 1st Battalion, The King's (Liverpool) Regiment, British Army during the First World War when the following deed took place for which he was awarded the VC.

On 16 April 1918 near Boisleux-Saint-Marc, France, it was necessary for information to be obtained from the front line and the only way to get it was over ground with no cover and in full view of the enemy. A small party tried without success, followed by six men, singly, each one being killed in the attempt. Private Counter then volunteered and, going out under terrific fire, got through and returned with vital information which enabled his commanding officer to organise and launch the final successful counter-attack. Subsequently, he also carried five messages across the open under heavy artillery barrage to company headquarters.

Counter left the army in 1921 with the rank of corporal. His medal is on display at the Jersey Museum, Saint Helier.

== Bibliography ==
- Buzzell, Nora, ed. (1997). The Register of the Victoria Cross. Cheltenham, Gloucestershire: This England Alma House. ISBN 0-906324-27-0.
- Gliddon, Gerald (2013) [2004]. Spring Offensive 1918. VCs of the First World War. Stroud, Gloucestershire: The History Press. ISBN 978-0-7524-8730-4.
- Harvey, David (2000). Monuments to Courage. Naval & Military Press Ltd. ISBN 1-84342-356-1.
