= Joseph Harcourt Tombs =

English Victoria Cross recipient (1887-1966)

- Born: 23 March 1887; Birmingham, England
- Died: 28 June 1966 (aged 79); Toronto, Ontario, Canada
- Burial place: Pine Hills Cemetery, Toronto
- Military career
- Allegiance: United Kingdom; Canada
- Branch: British Army; Royal Canadian Air Force
- Service years: 1912−1920 (UK); 1939−1944 (Canada)
- Rank: Corporal (UK); Sergeant (Canada)
- Service number: 10073
- Units: King's (Liverpool Regiment); The Royal Canadian Regiment
- Conflicts: First World War; Second World War
- Awards: Victoria Cross; Cross of St George 4th Class (Russia)

Sergeant Joseph Harcourt Tombs VC (23 March 1887 − 28 June 1966), born Frederick Griffith Tombs, who under the name Joseph Tombs, was an English recipient of the Victoria Cross (VC), the highest award of the British (Imperial) honours system. The VC is awarded for ‘most conspicuous bravery … in the presence of the enemy’.

== VC action ==
Tombs was born in Birmingham and was a 28-year-old Lance-Corporal in the 1st Battalion, The King's (Liverpool Regiment), British Army during the First World War when the following deed took place for which he was awarded the VC. On 16 May 1915 near Rue du Bois, France, Lance-Corporal Tombs, on his own initiative, crawled out repeatedly under very heavy shell and machine-gun fire to bring in wounded men who were lying about 100 yards in front of our trenches. He rescued four men, one of whom he dragged back by means of a rifle sling placed round his own neck and the man's body.

== Later life ==
He was promoted Corporal in the field (24 May 1915) and after the war, emigrated to Canada where he spent the rest of his life. On 25 May 1920, Tombs enlisted in the Canadian Army in Montréal, and served as a Private in The Royal Canadian Regiment. His attestation papers are held in The Royal Canadian Regiment Museum, Wolseley Barracks, London, Ontario). During the Second World War Tombs enlisted in the Royal Canadian Air Force and served at the Flying School in Trenton, Ontario, Canada. A 1952 operation to remove some of the shrapnel still embedded in his stomach was not completely successful, and in 1964 he suffered a stroke. His Victoria Cross is held by the Royal Regiment of Canada Foundation, Toronto, Ontario, Canada.

== Bibliography ==
- Batchelor, Peter; Matson, Christopher (2011). The Western Front 1915. VCs of the First World War. The History Press. ISBN 978-0-7524-6057-4.
- Oldfield, Paul (2014). Victoria Crosses on the Western Front August 1914–April 1915: Mons to Hill 60. Pen and Sword Books. ISBN 978-1783030439.
- Victoria Cross and the George Cross: the complete history (Methuen, 2013)
- Valiant Men: Canada's Victoria Cross and George Cross winners (edited by John Swettenham, 1973)
