= 1st Gibraltar Brigade =

WWII-era Gibraltar based military unit

The 1st Gibraltar Brigade was a British Army unit created in 1941 as a fortress brigade on Gibraltar. It remained as such throughout the Second World War. The brigade was a part of The Gibraltar Defence Force, established as a result of no local military force presence on the rock prior to the war. The Gibraltar Defence Force was a small anti aircraft unit that expanded as the war went on. As a part of the Gibraltar Defence Force, it was crucial to the war effort. Gibraltar's significance cannot be underplayed as it is known by many as the key to the strait. Even Gibraltar's coat of arms is a shield with a three towered castle with a golden key underneath. This shows the significance of the rock as the key to the strait. The first bombing of Gibraltar in 1940 did little to break morale and actually stiffened resolve among Gibraltarians. Some of which then decided to join the fight, as a part of the Gibraltar Defence Force. The rock was the choke point of Mediterranean Maritime activity and was crucial to the war effort for Britain and her allies. The rock had long been one of the most sought after location's for many empires. It was even considered "The Greatest Thoroughfare of Trade and Commerce in the World". The 1st Gibraltar Brigade and The Gibraltar Defence Force would be one of the most significant for the success of Britain and her allies.

== Significance ==
The strait was one of the most significant points of interest for many years prior to the war and during a wartime effort, it is obvious that this fact would not change. Of course then, the unit or units stationed to defend this key point of interest would be extremely crucial to the success of the war effort for those that controlled it. This was exactly the case for Britain and her allies. The Gibraltar Defence Force was created, on 13 March 1941, to defend the rock and maintain British presence at one of the most crucial points of the Mediterranean Sea. The mouth of the Mediterranean was a choke point for all maritime activity in the sea and Gibraltar acted as the key to that point. Gibraltar was also the key to the strait as well and was the way into Spain from the Mediterranean. As part of the Gibraltar Defence Force, the 1st Gibraltar Brigade's significance is equal to that of the rock itself. Those that fought bravely to ensure Gibraltar remained under Allied control were massive players in the scope of the war whether they knew it themselves or not.

== Components ==
- 2nd Battalion, King's Regiment (Liverpool), active on Gibraltar from 13 March 1941 to 17 November 1943
- 4th Battalion, Black Watch (Royal Highland Regiment), active on Gibraltar from 13 March 1941 to 25 April 1943
- Independent Company, active on Gibraltar from 13 March 1941 to 17 July 1944
- 2nd Royal Scots, active on Gibraltar from 22 April 1943 to 22 July 1944
- 1st Battalion, Hertfordshire Regiment, active on Gibraltar from 17 November 1943 to 22 July 1944
- 30th Battalion, Dorsetshire Regiment, active on Gibraltar from 22 July 1944 to 31 August 1945
- 31st Battalion, Suffolk Regiment, active on Gibraltar from 22 July 1944 to 31 August 1945
