= Liverpool Pals =

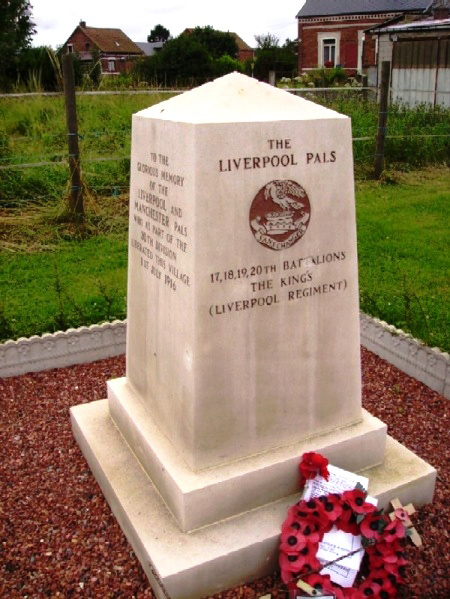
- Memorial at Montauban, Somme
- Active: 29 August 1914 – September 1919
- Country: United Kingdom
- Allegiance: British Crown
- Branch: British Army
- Type: Infantry
- Size: Six Battalions
- Engagements: First World War Western Front

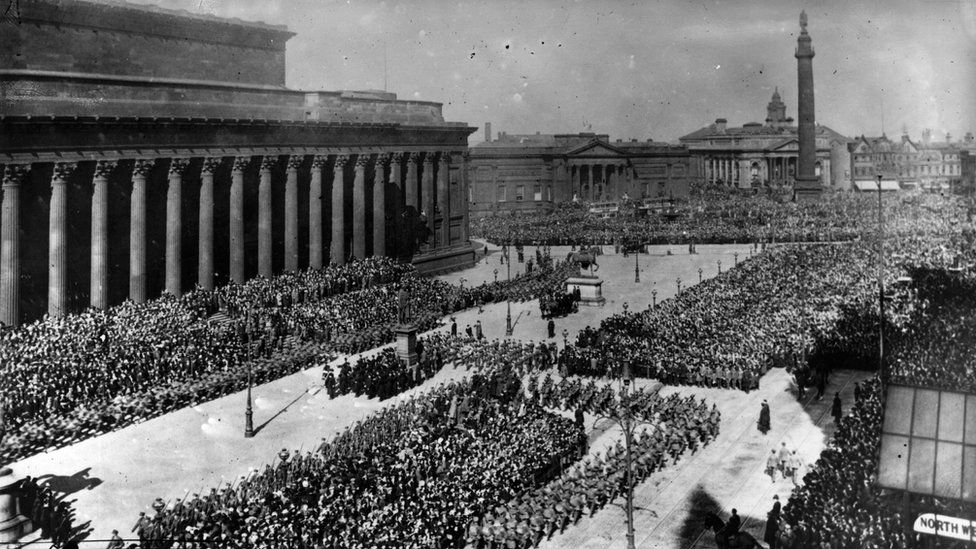
Inspection of the Liverpool Pals, 1915

The Liverpool Pals were Pals battalions formed during the First World War as part of the King's (Liverpool) Regiment. They, along with the Manchester Pals, are commemorated at a small memorial in France.

== Recruitment ==
The volunteers were initially sought at The Kings Regiment Liverpool HQ in St Anne Street on 28 August 1914, and were addressed by Lord Derby, who said:

I am not going to make you a speech of heroics. You have given me your answer, and I can telegraph to Lord Kitchener tonight to say that our second battalion is formed. This should be a Battalion of Pals, a battalion in which friends from the same office will fight shoulder to shoulder for the honour of Britain and the credit of Liverpool. I don’t attempt to minimise to you the hardships you will suffer, the risks you will run. I don’t ask you to uphold Liverpool’s honour, it would be an insult to think that you could do anything but that. But I do thank you from the bottom of my heart for coming here tonight and showing what is the spirit of Liverpool, a spirit that ought to spread through every city and every town in the kingdom.

Businesses had been asked to encourage their staff to enlist, and the volunteers were drawn from city offices and factories. Although similar events were held elsewhere, recruitment in Liverpool was said to be particularly strong. The numbers attending were far greater than anticipated, and extra rooms were opened up in order to enlist them. By November, enough volunteers had come forward to form four battalions.

Barracks were created on disused sites at Prescot, Hooton, Sefton Park and Knowsley Park before further training on Salisbury Plain. They left for France in late 1915, and took part in some of the fiercest battles of the war, with heavy loss of life. Almost 200 of the Liverpool Pals were killed in one day, 1 July 1916, in the Battle of the Somme. At the end of the war, about 20% of the volunteers had been killed, and a further 50% injured.

The Liverpool Pals consisted of:

- 17th (Service) Battalion, King's (Liverpool Regiment) (1st City), formed at Liverpool, 29 August 1914 by Lord Derby; reduced to cadre in France, June 1918; reconstituted from personnel of 28th (Service) Bn, King's (Liverpool Regiment), 3 July 1918; disbanded at Ripon, 13 September 1919
- 18th (Service) Battalion, King's (Liverpool Regiment) (2nd City), formed at Liverpool, 29 August 1914 by Lord Derby; absorbed 1/1st Lancashire Hussars 24 September 1917 and redesignated 18th (Lancashire Hussars Yeomanry) Bn; absorbed 13th (Service) Battalion, King's (Liverpool Regiment) (Pioneers) 13 August 1918; disbanded at Barrow-in-Furness 20 May 1919
- 19th (Service) Battalion, King's (Liverpool Regiment) (3rd City), formed at Liverpool, 29 August 1914 by Lord Derby; absorbed into 14th (Service) Battalion, King's (Liverpool Regiment) 31 July 1918
- 20th (Service) Battalion, King's (Liverpool Regiment) (4th City), formed at Liverpool, 16 October 1914 by Lord Derby; disbanded in France 16 February 1918
- 21st (Reserve) Battalion – formed at Knowsley Park, August 1915 from depot companies of 17th and 18th Battalions; became 67th Training Reserve Battalion 1 September 1916; disbanded at Ripon 14 December 1917
- 22nd (Reserve) Battalion – formed at Knowsley Park, August 1915 from depot companies of 19th and 20th Battalions; became 68th Training Reserve Battalion 1 September 1916; disbanded at Ripon 14 December 1917

== Bibliography ==
- J.B.M. Frederick, Lineage Book of British Land Forces 1660–1978, Vol I, Wakefield: Microform Academic, 1984, ISBN 1-85117-007-3.
- Brig E.A. James, British Regiments 1914–18, London: Samson Books, 1978, ISBN 0-906304-03-2/Uckfield: Naval & Military Press, 2001, ISBN 978-1-84342-197-9.
- Graham Maddocks, Liverpool Pals: 17th, 18th, 19th, 20th (Service) Battalions, The King's (Liverpool Regiment), Barnsley: Pen & Sword, 2008, ISBN 978-1-84415641-2.
