= Lancastrian Volunteers =

- Active: 1967–1975
- Country: United Kingdom
- Branch: British Army
- Type: Infantry
- Role: Line Infantry
- Size: Regiment
- Garrison/HQ: Peninsula Barracks, Warrington

The Lancastrian Volunteers was a short lived Territorial Army infantry regiment of the British Army, composed of companies from the North West affiliated regiments.

== History ==
The regiment was formed in 1967, by the amalgamation of the seven Territorial Battalions within the Lancastrian Brigade, with its headquarters at Peninsula Barracls, Warrington.

It was initially composed of five companies that continued to wear the badges of the regiments that they were affiliated to.

- HQ Company (Lancashire Regiment (Prince of Wales's Volunteers)), at Warrington – from 4th Battalion, East Lancashire Regiment, and 4th Battalion, South Lancashire Regiment
- A Company (King's Own Border), at Carlisle – from 4th Battalion, King's Own Royal Regiment (Lancaster), and 4th Battalion, Border Regiment
- B Company (King's), at Liverpool – from 5th Battalion, King's Regiment (Liverpool)
- C Company (Manchester), at Manchester – from 8th and 9th Battalions, Manchester Regiment
- D Company (Loyals), at Preston – from 5th Battalion, Loyal Regiment (North Lancashire)

In 1969, a new Company was raised, namely E Company (King's Own), at Lancaster and Barrow-in-Furness; formed from cadres of 4th/5th (T) Battalion, King's Own Royal Regiment, and 4th Battalion, East Lancashire Regiment.

In 1971, the regiment formed a second battalion, and consequently the existing battalion was redesignated as the 1st Battalion. D Company was also transferred to the new battalion, retaining its title.

=== 1st Battalion ===
- HQ Company (Lancashire Regiment (Prince of Wales's Volunteers)), at Warrington
- A Company (King's Own Border), at Carlisle
- B Company (King's), at Liverpool
- C Company (Manchester), at Manchester
- E Company (King's Own), at Lancaster and Barrow-in-Furness

=== 2nd Battalion ===
The 2nd Battalion, formed with its headquarters at Preston from both cadres of former units, and newly raised companies.

- A (East Lancashire) Company, at Burnley and Haslingden – from cadre of 4th Battalion, East Lancashire Regiment
- B Company, at Liverpool – newly raised
- C (Manchester) Company, at Ashton under Lyne – from cadre of 8th/9th Battalion, Manchester Regiment
- D Company, at Preston – redesignation of D Company, 1st Battalion

=== Disbandment ===
In 1973, the company subtitles were omitted, due to the fact that the regimental affiliations and traditions had begun to fade and blur.

Then, in 1975, the decision was made to break up the regiment and place the TA units back directly under their affiliated regiments. Therefore, the 1st Battalion was broken up, with HQ, B, and C Companies joining 5th/8th Battalion, King's Regiment, retaining their lettering; and A and E Companies were transferred to 4th (Volunteer) Battalion, King's Own Royal Border Regiment, also keeping their company designations. The 2nd Battalion, was redesignated entirely, less B Company, as 4th (Volunteer) Battalion, Queen's Lancashire Regiment; with B Company becoming D Company, 5th/8th Battalion, King's Regiment.
