= List of orders of battle for the British 7th Armoured Division =

Mobile Division, Egypt / Mobile Division (Egypt) Armoured Division (Egypt) 7th Armoured Division
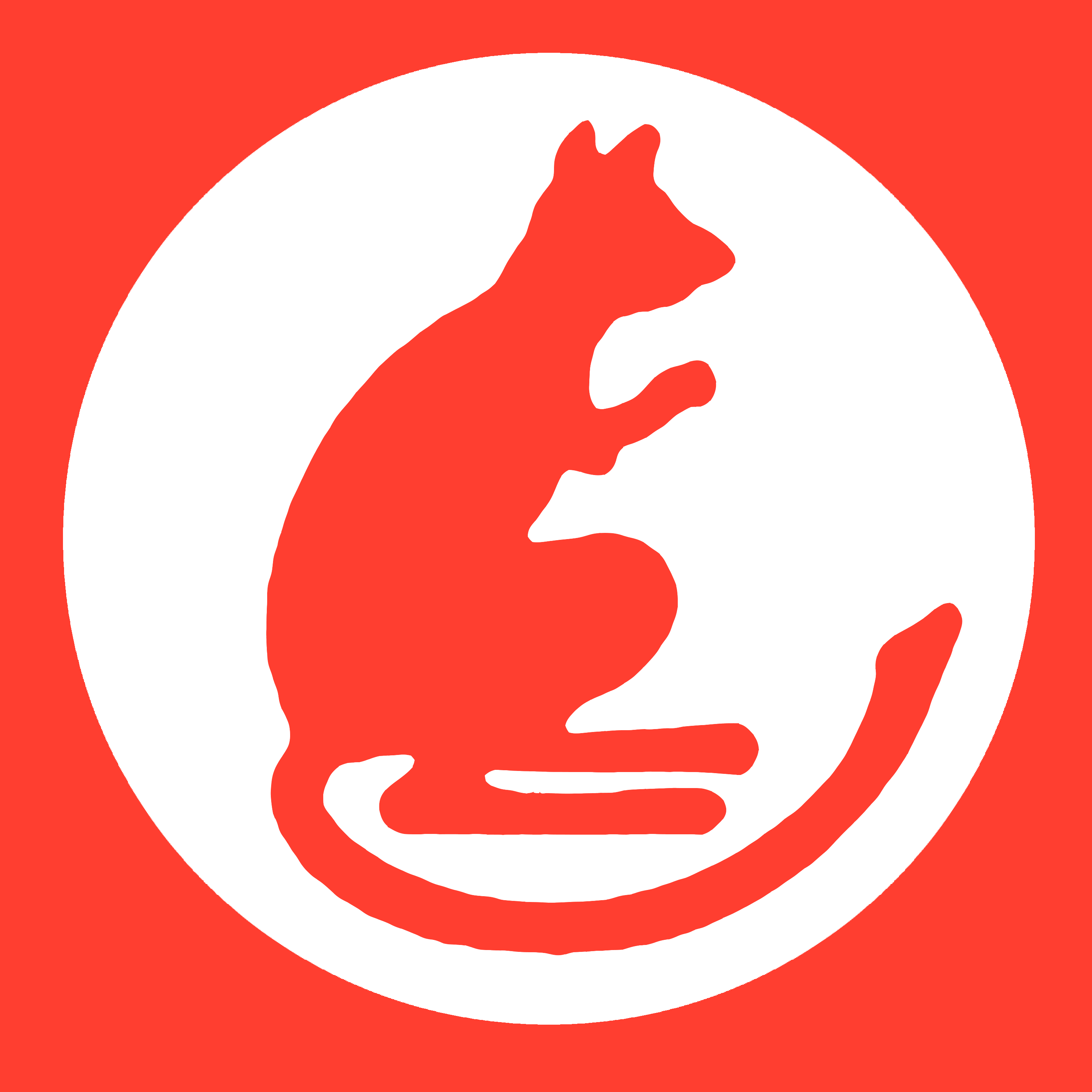
- The first divisional insignia to use a jerboa, used from c.1940 until late 1943. Variants of the design existed in red and pink. Other than the general officer commanding, it is believed that this insignia was not worn on uniforms and was only painted on the division's vehicles.
- Active: 1938–1958
- Country: United Kingdom
- Branch: British Army
- Engagements: Second World War

An order of battle is a list of the various elements of a military formation organised within a hierarchical command structure. It can also provide information on the strength of that formation and the equipment used. An order of battle is not necessarily a set structure, and it can change depending on tactical or strategic developments, or the evolution of military doctrine. For example, a division could be altered radically from one campaign to another through the adding or removing of subunits but retain its identity and prior history. The size of a division can vary dramatically as a result of what forces are assigned and the doctrine employed at that time.

The 7th Armoured Division was an armoured division of the British Army, which was formed in 1938. Detailed information for post-war orders of battle are not readily available.

== Inter-war period ==
In September 1938, due to European tensions between Britain and the Axis powers, British forces based in Egypt were redeployed from the Suez Canal and Cairo areas to Mersa Matruh in the Western Desert, in preparation for a possible attack by Italy from Italian Libya. This ad hoc formation was dubbed the Mobile Force. When tensions subsided, due to the Munich Agreement, the force returned east and was located near Cairo. It was then joined by Major-General Percy Hobart who was ordered to form an armoured division in Egypt. The Army List, for December 1938, highlighted the disjointed nature of this effort, with the Mobile Division (Egypt) having no units of its own. The higher command, British Troops in Egypt, held direct responsibility over most of what had been in the Mobile Force and what would become the 7th Armoured Division.

In April 1939, several nomenclature changes took place. The Mobile Division (Egypt) was renamed the Armoured Division (Egypt) and the Cairo Cavalry Brigade became the Light Armoured Brigade (Egypt), the later would eventually be renamed the 7th Armoured Brigade. On 4 April 1939, the Royal Armoured Corps was formed to command all mechanised cavalry and the battalions of the Royal Tank Corps. The latter was renamed the Royal Tank Regiment and its nomenclature colloquially changed; each unit dropped the word battalion from their names, although this was not officially adopted until September 1945. The Heavy Armoured Brigade (Egypt), what would become the 4th Armoured Brigade, started to form in 1939 from units previously assigned to British Troops in Egypt.

The 7th and 8th Hussars were equipped with various models of light tanks while the 11th Hussars (Prince Albert's Own) were outfitted with Morris Armoured Cars. The two Royal Tank Regiment units used a mixture of A9 Cruisers and Mk VI light tanks. (Note: The British military defined light tanks as reconnaissance vehicles, which were armed only with machine guns. Cruiser tanks were swiftly moving, more heavily armoured, and equipped with machine guns and an anti-tank weapon. The cruiser tank's role was to engage and destroy enemy armoured forces. Its main weapon, a 2-pounder anti-tank gun, was supplied only with armour-piercing rounds, leaving cruiser tanks ineffective against entrenched infantry or at suppressing hostile artillery.) Prior to the outbreak of the war, a 'pivot group' was formed. British military thinking for armoured formations designated that all supporting arms (infantry, artillery, engineers) would be assigned to these groups, thus leaving the armoured brigades with just tanks. Doctrine dictated that the infantry did not supplement the tanks, but rather protected them at leaguer, defended positions occupied by the administrative and supply vehicles, or secured locations that the tanks had captured.

=== Mobile Force (September–October 1938) ===
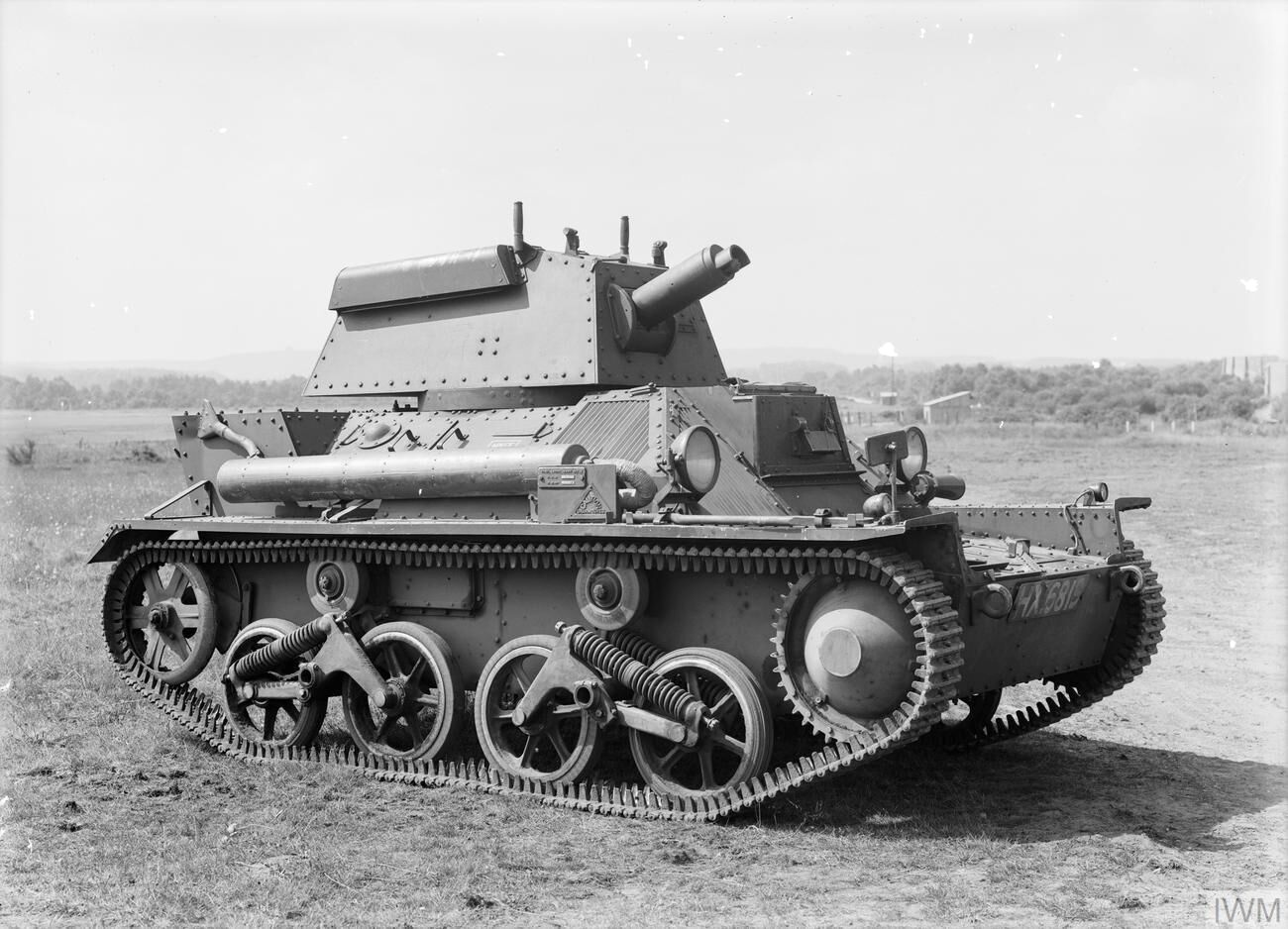
An example of the Light Tank MK III. The 7th Hussars were equipped with an array of light tanks, including this model.

Mobile Force

Cairo Cavalry Brigade

- 7th Queen's Own Hussars
- 8th King's Royal Irish Hussars
- 11th Hussars (Prince Albert's Own)
- 1st Battalion, Royal Tank Corps
- 3rd Regiment, Royal Horse Artillery
- 2nd Field Company, Royal Engineers (attached)
- No. 5 Company, Royal Army Service Corps
- 2nd/3rd Field Ambulance, Royal Army Medical Corps
- 1st Battalion, King's Royal Rifle Corps (joined in October)

=== British Troops in Egypt (December 1938) ===
British Troops in Egypt (only relevant units displayed)

Mobile Division

- No subordinate units

Cairo Cavalry Brigade (Note: The 11th Hussars (Prince Albert's Own) had, by this point, temporarily relocated to Mandatory Palestine.)

- 7th Queen's Own Hussars
- 8th King's Royal Irish Hussars

Canal Brigade

- 1st Battalion, King's Royal Rifle Corps

Directly controlled by British Troops in Egypt

- 3rd Regiment, Royal Horse Artillery
- 2nd Field Company, Royal Engineers
- 1st Battalion, Royal Tank Corps
- 6th Battalion, Royal Tank Corps
- No. 5 Company, Royal Army Service Corps

=== Eve of war ===
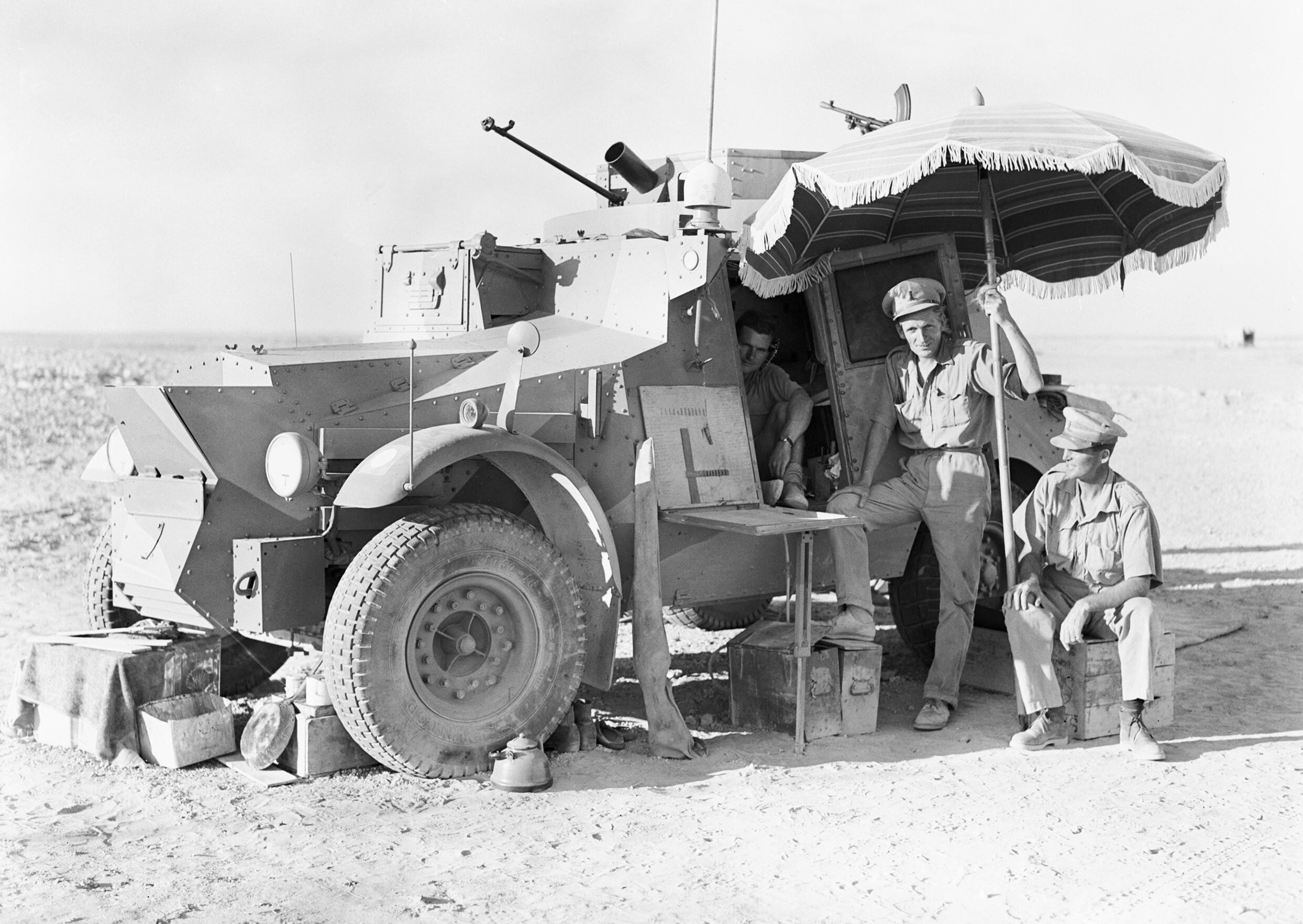
A Morris Armoured Car of the 11th Hussars, this photo is from 1940.

Armoured Division (Egypt)

Light Armoured Brigade (Egypt)

- 7th Queen's Own Hussars
- 8th King's Royal Irish Hussars
- 11th Hussars (Prince Albert's Own)

Heavy Armoured Brigade (Egypt)

- 1st Royal Tank Regiment
- 6th Royal Tank Regiment

Pivot Group

- 3rd Regiment, Royal Horse Artillery
- F Battery, 4th Regiment, Royal Horse Artillery
- 1st Battalion, King's Royal Rifle Corps

== Opening phase of the Second World War ==
After the start of the Second World War, in September 1939, the division's pivot group was not included on any official order of battle, and the forces that would have been assigned to it appear as divisional assets instead. A new one, the 7th Support Group, was formed in January 1940. At full strength, the group would have sixteen 25-pounder field gun-howitzers, twenty-four 2-pounder anti-tank guns, and twenty-four Bofors 40 mm gun anti-aircraft guns. In October 1940, such groups were supposed to be reorganised with one infantry battalion being removed and sent to join an armoured brigade. However, the division's support group did not follow this change and maintained two battalions through to November 1941. Other changes included the 11th Hussars (Prince Albert's Own) being removed from the 7th Armoured Brigade, as they were an armoured car regiment and not a tank unit, and being placed directly under the command of the division. This allowed the formation to have a dedicated reconnaissance element.

=== September 1939 ===
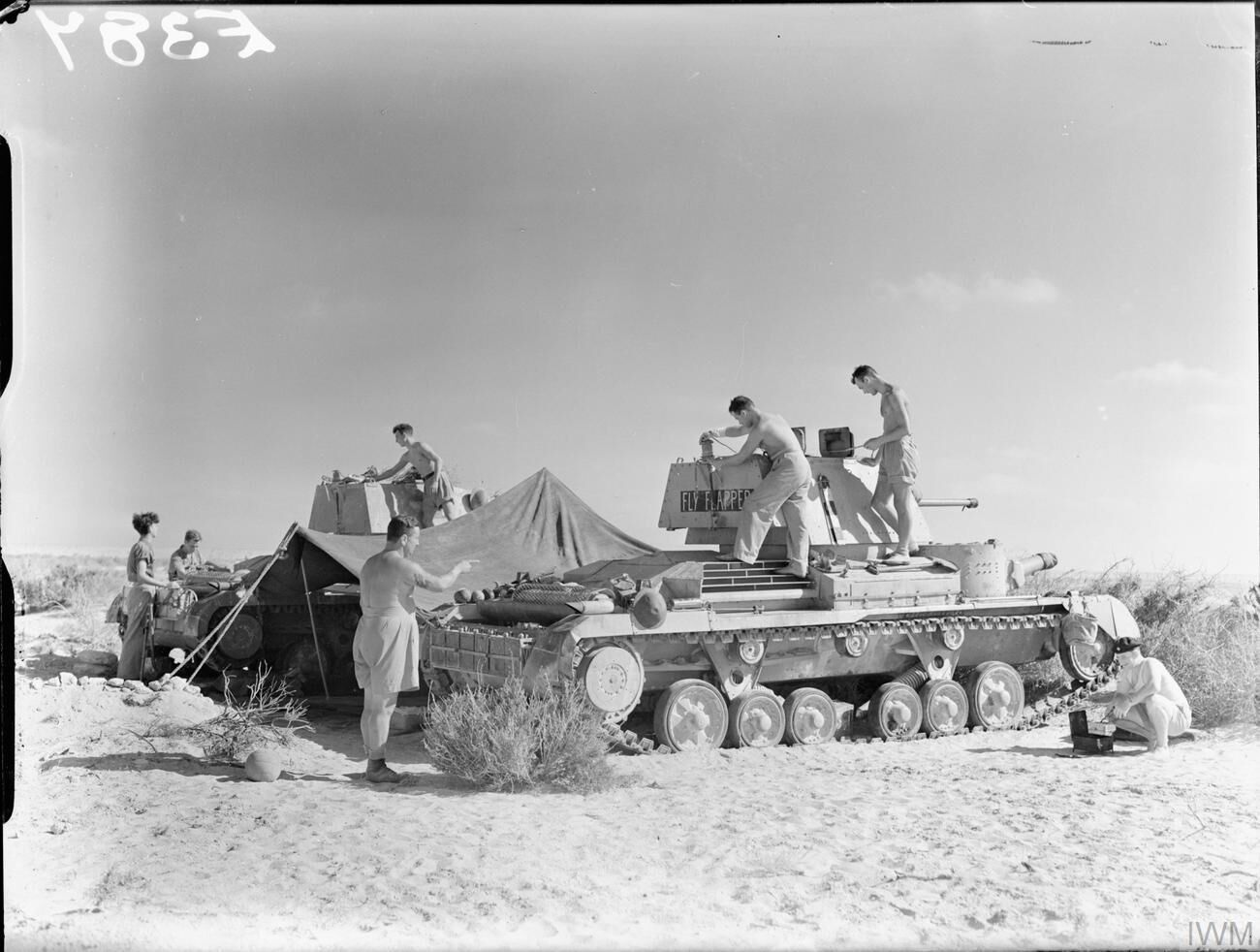
An example of the Cruiser Mk I (A9)

Armoured Division (Egypt)

Heavy Armoured Brigade (Egypt)

- 1st Royal Tank Regiment
- 6th Royal Tank Regiment

Light Armoured Brigade (Egypt)

- 7th Queen's Own Hussars
- 8th King's Royal Irish Hussars
- 11th Hussars (Prince Albert's Own)

Divisional Troops

- M Battery, 3rd Regiment, Royal Horse Artillery (anti-tank)
- C Battery, 4th Regiment, Royal Horse Artillery
- 1st Battalion, King's Royal Rifle Corps
- Divisional signals, Royal Corps of Signals

=== 1940 ===
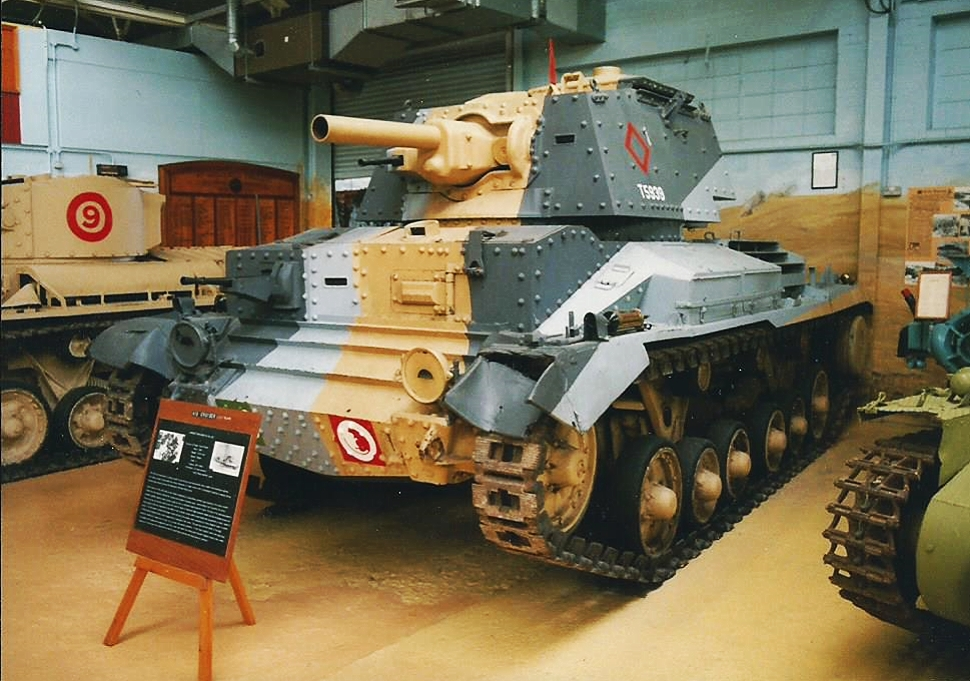
An example of the Cruiser Mk II (A10). This one is a close support variant. Rather than being fitted with an anti-tank weapon, close-support tanks were equipped with a howitzer. These were capable of firing smoke and high-explosive rounds and not intended to oppose other tanks. (Note: These photographs demonstrate the Caunter camouflage pattern used by the British in the Western Desert. This was an angular disruptive three-colour scheme, which called for the use of stone, sand, and silver-grey. The latter was often replaced with blue-based colors due to the lack of availability. Some variants included pale cream in the color scheme. The Caunter style was officially maintained until the end of 1941, when replaced by an overall stone colouration although some examples exist showing attempted disruptive patterns with white and black. By the Second Battle of El Alamein, desert pink, greens, and browns were in use. Local variations, outside of official schemes, also occurred due to the lack of material or lack of time to repaint vehicles.)

7th Armoured Division (Note: At the start of the year, the formation was still called the Armoured Division (Egypt) until it was renamed as the 7th Armoured Division on 16 February.)

4th Armoured Brigade (Note: Started the year as the Heavy Armoured Brigade (Egypt), it was redesignated as the 4th Heavy Armoured Brigade on 16 February, before being renamed the 4th Armoured Brigade on 14 April.)

- 1st Royal Tank Regiment (until 10 April)
- 6th Royal Tank Regiment
- 7th Queen's Own Hussars (from 10 April)
- 2nd Royal Tank Regiment (from 13 October 1940)

7th Armoured Brigade (Note: Started the year as the Light Armoured Brigade (Egypt), it was redesignated as the 7th Light Armoured Brigade on 16 February, before being renamed as the 7th Armoured Brigade on 14 April.)

- 7th Queen's Own Hussars (until 10 April)
- 8th King's Royal Irish Hussars
- 11th Hussars (Prince Albert's Own) (until 14 April)
- 1st Royal Tank Regiment (from 10 April)
- 3rd The King's Own Hussars (from 13 October)

7th Support Group (formed 22 January)

- M Battery, 3rd Regiment, Royal Horse Artillery (anti-tank)
- C Battery, 4th Regiment, Royal Horse Artillery
- 1st Battalion, King's Royal Rifle Corps
- 2nd Battalion, Rifle Brigade
- 3rd Battalion, Coldstream Guards (attached)
- French Motor Marine Company (attached)

Divisional Troops (Note: The division's engineer headquarters was formed in April 1940, but no engineering units were attached. The 4th Field Squadron and the 143rd Field Park Troop were formed in the UK and dispatched to supplement the division by November, but they did not join until 1941 having been assigned to other units after their arrival in Egypt. Engineer units were temporarily attached, in the meantime, as needed.)

- Divisional signals, Royal Corps of Signals
- 11th Hussars (Prince Albert's Own) (from 10 April)
- D Squadron, No. 2 Armoured Car Company RAF (from October, attached to 11th Hussars)

== North African campaign ==
=== Operation Compass (December 1940–9 February 1941) ===
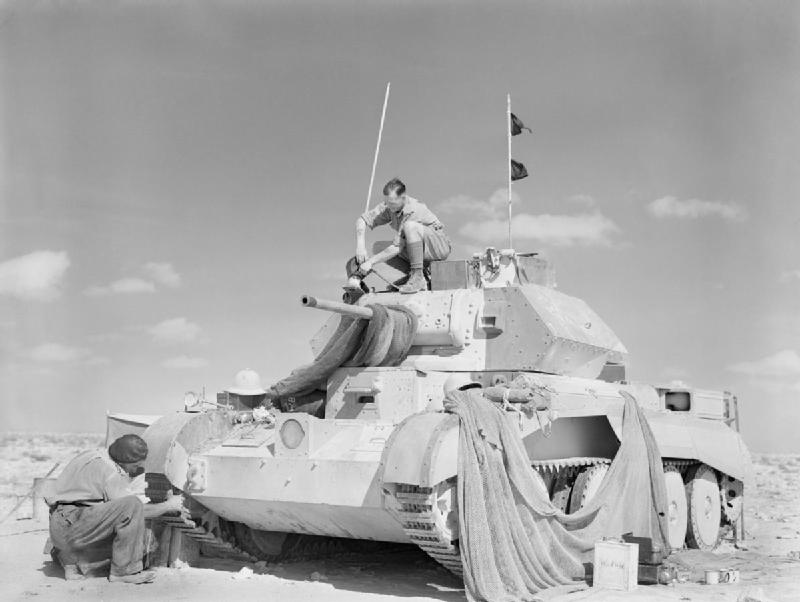
An example of the Cruiser Mk IV (A13), after it had just arrived in Egypt in late 1940.

7th Armoured Division

4th Armoured Brigade

- 2nd Royal Tank Regiment (Note: One squadron was assigned to the 3rd Hussars, and in turn one squadron from that regiment was assigned to the 2RTR.)
- 6th Royal Tank Regiment (until 19 January)
- 7th Queen's Own Hussars

7th Armoured Brigade

- 1st Royal Tank Regiment
- 3rd The King's Own Hussars (until 22 January) (Note: One squadron was assigned to the 2RTR, and in turn one squadron from that regiment was assigned to the 3rd Hussars.)
- 8th King's Royal Irish Hussars (until 19 January)

7th Support Group

- M Battery, 3rd Regiment, Royal Horse Artillery (anti-tank)
- C Battery, 4th Regiment, Royal Horse Artillery
- 1st Light Anti-Aircraft Batter (joined 4 January)
- 1st Battalion, King's Royal Rifle Corps
- 2nd Battalion, Rifle Brigade

Divisional Troops

- Divisional signals, Royal Corps of Signals
- 11th Hussars (Prince Albert's Own)
- D Squadron, No. 2 Armoured Car Company RAF (attached to 11th Hussars)
- 3rd Regiment, Royal Horse Artillery (less M Battery) (attached)
- 106th Regiment, Royal Horse Artillery (attached)
- Royal Engineers (attached)
  - 2nd Field Squadron
  - 141st Field Park Troop
- No. 5, 58, 65, and 550th Companies, Royal Army Service Corps
- 4th New Zealand Reserve Company (attached)
- 1st Supply Issue Section, Indian Army Service Corps (attached)
- 2nd/3rd Cavalry Field Ambulance, Royal Army Medical Corps
- 3rd/3rd Cavalry Field Ambulance, Royal Army Medical Corps
- Royal Army Ordnance Corps
  - Divisional workshops
  - Divisional Ordnance Field Park
  - Divisional Forward Delivery Workshop Section
  - 1st Light Repair Section
  - 2nd Light Repair Section
  - 3rd Light Repair Section

=== Operation Crusader (November–December 1941) ===
7th Armoured Division

4th Armoured Brigade Group (until 19 December)

- 3rd Royal Tank Regiment
- 5th Royal Tank Regiment
- 8th King's Royal Irish Hussars
- 2nd Regiment, Royal Horse Artillery
- 2nd Battalion, Scots Guards

7th Armoured Brigade (until 27 November)

- 2nd Royal Tank Regiment
- 6th Royal Tank Regiment
- 7th Queen's Own Hussars

22nd Armoured Brigade (until 22 November)

- 2nd Royal Gloucestershire Hussars
- 3rd County of London Yeomanry (Sharpshooters)
- 4th County of London Yeomanry (Sharpshooters)

7th Support Group (until 27 December)

- 3rd Regiment, Royal Horse Artillery
- 4th Regiment, Royal Horse Artillery
- 1st Light Anti-Aircraft Regiment, Royal Artillery
- 1st Battalion, King's Royal Rifle Corps (until 25 November)
- 2nd Battalion, Rifle Brigade
- 60th Field Regiment, Royal Artillery (attached)
- One battery, 51st Field Regiment, Royal Artillery (attached)

Divisional Troops

- Divisional engineers, Royal Engineers
  - 4th Field Squadron
  - 143rd Field Park Squadron
- Royal Army Medical Corps
  - 2nd Light Field Ambulance
  - 13th Light Field Ambulance
  - 15th Light Field Ambulance
  - 7th Light Field Hygiene Section
- Royal Army Ordnance Corps
  - Divisional workshops
  - Divisional Ordnance Field Park
  - Divisional Forward Delivery Workshop Section
  - 1st Light Repair Section
  - 2nd Light Repair Section
  - 3rd Light Repair Section
- Divisional signals, Royal Corps of Signals
- 11th Hussars (Prince Albert's Own)
- 4th South African Armoured Car Regiment (attached)
- King's Dragoon Guards (attached)

=== Second Battle of El Alamein ===
Organization IV (February 1942) reorganized divisions into one armoured brigade group and one motorised brigade group, each with attached artillery and engineers. Organization VI (August 1942) was the essentially same as organization V which was applied in the U.K. only, applied in the Middle East two months later. This returned supporting arms to division control, with an increase in all types of artillery. The 7th Armoured Division initially had two Armoured Brigades, of different organizations.

- 4th Armoured Brigade (left 3 March 1943 still organized as a Brigade Group)
  - 4th/8th Hussars
  - Royal Scots Greys (2nd Dragoons)
  - 1st Battalion King's Royal Rifle Corps
  - 3rd Regiment Royal Horse Artillery (returned to 7th Division 3 March 1943)
  - Troop from 42nd Battery, 15th Light Anti-Aircraft Regiment
  - Troop from 21st Field Squadron R.E.
  - 5th, 58th Support Companies R.A.S.C.
  - 14th Light Field Ambulance R.A.M.C.
- 22nd Armoured Brigade (joined 26 July 1942)
  - 1st Royal Tank Regiment
  - 5th Royal Tank Regiment
  - 4th County of London Yeomanry (Sharpshooters)
  - 1st Battalion Rifle Brigade
- 131st Lorried Infantry Brigade (joined 1 November 1942)
  - 1/5th Queen's Royal Regiment (West Surrey)
  - 1/6th Queen's Royal Regiment (West Surrey)
  - 1/7th Queen's Royal Regiment (West Surrey)
- Division Troops
  - 7th Division Signals
  - 11th Hussars (in reserve)
  - 1st Household Cavalry Regiment (attached)
  - 44th Reconnaissance Regiment (attached from 44th Division with two troops of Scorpion Tanks)
  - 2nd Derbyshire Yeomanry (attached)
  - Royal Artillery
    - 4th Field Regiment (joined 16 September—left 10 December 1942)
    - 97th (Kent Yeomanry) Field Regiment (joined 13 September—left 1 December 1942)
    - 65th (Suffolk & Norfolk Yeomanry) Anti-Tank Regiment (joined 13 September 1942)
    - 15th (Isle of Man) Light Anti-Aircraft Regiment (joined 2 August 1942)
  - Royal Engineers
    - 4th Field Squadron (joined 24 August 1942)
    - 21st Field Squadron
    - 143rd Field Park Squadron
  - R.A.M.C.
    - 2nd Light Field Ambulance

== Italian campaign ==
Organization VII introduced little change, the attachment of a machine gun company to the infantry brigade, and the replacement of armoured cars with tanks in the reconnaissance regiment.

- 22nd Armoured Brigade
  - 1st Royal Tank Regiment
  - 5th Royal Tank Regiment
  - 4th County of London Yeomanry (Sharpshooters)
  - 1st Battalion, Rifle Brigade
- 131st Infantry Brigade
  - 1/5th Battalion, Queen's Royal Regiment (West Surrey)
  - 1/6th Battalion, Queen's Royal Regiment (West Surrey)
  - 1/7th Battalion, Queen's Royal Regiment (West Surrey)
  - 'C' Company, 1st Battalion, Cheshire Regiment (Machine Gun) (joined 1 August 1943)
- Divisional Troops
  - 7th Division Signals
  - 11th Hussars (left 3 November 1943)
  - Royal Artillery
    - 3rd Regiment, Royal Horse Artillery
    - 5th Regiment, Royal Horse Artillery (joined 1 December 1942)
    - 15th (Isle of Man) Light AA Regiment Royal Artillery
    - 65th (Suffolk & Norfolk Yeomanry) Anti Tank Regiment
    - 24th Field Regiment (attached)
    - 69th Medium Regiment (attached)
    - 146th (Pembroke & Cardiganshire) Field Regiment (attached)
  - Royal Engineers
    - 4th Field Squadron
    - 621st Field Squadron
    - 143rd Field Park Squadron

== Northwest Europe campaign ==
Organization VIII, consolidated the continuing changes in formations, increasing the reconnaissance regiment strength, moving the machine gun company to division troops and adding a bridging troop of engineers.

- 22nd Armoured Brigade
  - 1st Royal Tank Regiment
  - 5th Royal Tank Regiment
  - 4th County of London Yeomanry (left 29 July 1944)
  - 5th Royal Inniskilling Dragoon Guards (joined 29 July 1944)
  - 1st Battalion, Rifle Brigade
- 131st Infantry Brigade
  - 1/5th Battalion, Queen's Royal Regiment (West Surrey)
  - 1/6th Battalion, Queen's Royal Regiment (West Surrey) (left 3 December 1944)
  - 1/7th Battalion, Queen's Royal Regiment (West Surrey) (left 3 December 1944)
  - 2nd Battalion, Devonshire Regiment (joined 1 December 1944)
  - 9th Battalion, Durham Light Infantry (joined 2 December 1944)
- Divisional Troops
  - 7th Division Signals
  - 8th King's Royal Irish Hussars (joined 16 December 1943)
  - 3rd Independent Machine Gun Company
  - Royal Artillery
    - 3rd Regiment, Royal Horse Artillery
    - 5th Regiment, Royal Horse Artillery
    - 15th (Isle of Man) Light AA Regiment Royal Artillery
    - 65th (Norfolk Yeomanry) Anti Tank Regiment Royal Artillery
  - Royal Engineers
    - 4th Field Squadron
    - 621st Field Squadron
    - 143rd Field Park Squadron
    - 7th Bridging Troop
    - 7th Armoured Division Postal Unit
  - R.A.S.C.
    - 58th Armoured Brigade Company
    - 67th Infantry Brigade Company
    - 507th Armoured Divisional Troops Company
    - 133rd Armoured Divisional Transport Company
  - R.A.M.C.
    - 2nd Light Field Ambulance
    - 131st Light Field Ambulance
    - 29th Field Dressing Station
    - 70th Field Hygiene Section
    - 134th Mobile Dental Unit Army Dental Corps

== Notes ==
Footnotes

Citations
