= Manx Regiment =

15th (Isle of Man) Light Anti-Aircraft Regiment, RA 515 (Isle of Man) Light Anti-Aircraft Regiment, RA
- Royal Artillery cap badge
- Active: 1 July 1938 – 10 March 1955
- Country: United Kingdom
- Branch: Territorial Army
- Type: Artillery
- Role: Light Anti-Aircraft
- Size: Regiment
- Part of: 4th AA Division; 2nd AA Brigade; 12th AA Brigade; 7th Armoured Division; 59 AA Brigade
- Peacetime HQ: Douglas, Isle of Man
- Engagements: Western Desert; East Africa; Crete; Alamein; Tunisia; Italy; Normandy; North West Europe

The Manx Regiment – the 15th (Isle of Man) Light Anti Aircraft Regiment, Royal Artillery – was raised in 1938 as a Territorial Army (TA) unit of the British Army. It recruited on the Isle of Man and formed part of Anti-Aircraft Command at the outbreak of the Second World War. The regiment was posted to the Middle East in November 1940, serving in the Western Desert, East Africa and Crete (where one of its batteries was lost). In August 1942, it became the air defence regiment for the 7th Armoured Division (the 'Desert Rats'). It served with the division through the North African, Italian and North West European campaigns. It was reformed in the postwar TA as 515 (Isle of Man) Light Anti-Aircraft Regiment before being reduced to a staff troop in 42nd (Lancashire) Division in 1955.

== Origin ==
In 1938, during the period of international tension preceding the Second World War, the TA began to raise specialist Light Anti-Aircraft (LAA) regiments of the Royal Artillery (RA), to supplement the existing Heavy Anti-Aircraft (HAA) units. The 15th (Isle of Man) Light Anti-Aircraft Brigade, Royal Artillery, was formed at Douglas, IoM, on 1 July 1938. It was organised with two batteries that were numbered 41 and 42 in December. On 1 January 1939, it was redesignated as a regiment rather than a brigade, in line with the RA's modernisation of its terminology. (Note: The basic organic unit of the Regular Royal Artillery was, and is, the Battery, two or more batteries being 'brigaded' together (as distinct from the larger infantry or cavalry brigades); artillery brigades were redesignated as regiments in 1938. However, in the TA the unit's lineage and history resided in the brigade/regiment rather than the battery.) At this stage, light anti-aircraft (LAA) units were armed with Light machine guns (AALMGs), but the new Bofors 40 mm gun was on order.

== Second World War ==
=== Mobilisation ===
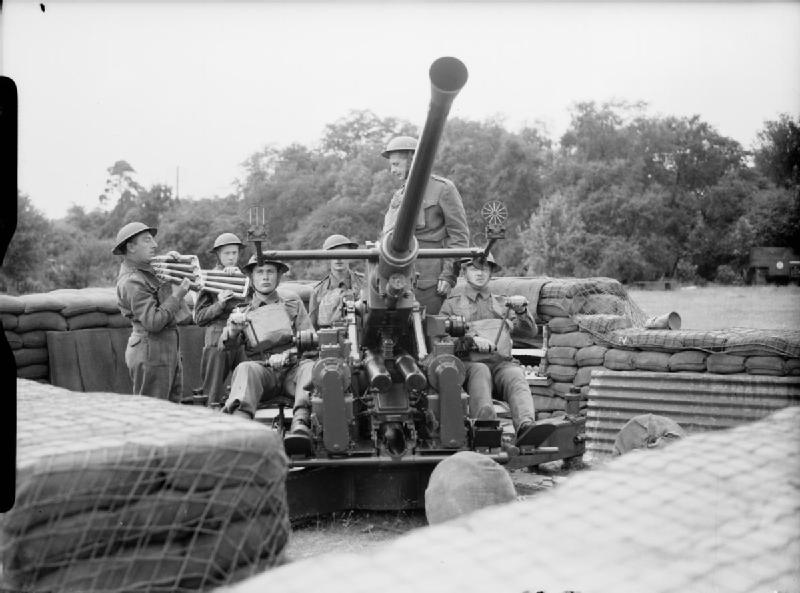
Bofors gun emplacement, summer, 1940.

In February 1939, the existing AA defences came under the control of a new Anti-Aircraft Command. In June, as the international situation worsened, a partial mobilisation of the TA was begun in a process known as 'couverture', whereby each AA unit did a month's tour of duty in rotation to man selected AA gun and searchlight positions. On 24 August, ahead of the declaration of war, AA Command was fully mobilised and moved to its war stations, with LAA units distributed to defend Vulnerable Points (VPs) such as factories, docks and airfields. During this mobilisation the regiment formed a third battery, numbered 129, on 26 August. 15th (IoM) LAA Regiment sailed to Liverpool to take up air defence of the River Mersey and war was declared on 3 September.

15th LAA Regiment formed part of a new 53rd Light Anti-Aircraft Brigade that was forming in 4th Anti-Aircraft Division, which was responsible for defending the industrial areas of North West England. During the period of the Phoney War the AA defences of NW England were not tested in action, and the time was spent in equipping and training the TA units.

After the entry of Italy into the war, in June 1940, there was an urgent need to reinforce British forces in the Middle East, and a series of convoys began shipping troops (including AA units) on the six-week journey via the Cape of Good Hope and the Red Sea to Egypt. 15th LAA Regiment was one of the first units selected (leaving the UK as The Blitz was starting) and arrived in January 1941. It initially joined GHQ Reserve with 122 LAA Bty detached from 13th LAA Rgt also under its command. By then the Italian invasion of Egypt had been defeated, but the commitments of Middle East Forces were widening, including campaigns in East Africa and Greece. The regiment was split up, with each battery being detached to a different campaign.

=== Egypt ===
By 31 January 1941, Regimental HQ (RHQ) and 42 LAA Bty formed part of 2nd AA Brigade in the Nile Delta area, with 42 Bty deployed at Ismailia. Towards the end of January 1941, the Luftwaffe had begun attacking the Suez Canal from Italian bases on Rhodes, dropping magnetic and acoustic mines at night to disrupt shipping in the canal. Most of the vital supplies and reinforcements therefore had to be landed at Suez rather than passing through the canal. Defending against these attacks was an obvious role for searchlights (S/Ls) and LAA guns, but the numbers required for complete coverage were excessive. The compromise plan involved siting single S/Ls on either side of the canal at 2,200 yards (2,000 m) intervals, with additional rows on the flanks spaced at 5-6000-yard intervals. Thus, illumination was restricted to a belt along the length of the canal. Fighter aircraft were to provide the main defence, but the need to defend against low-level raids led to the deployment of single Bofors guns spaced at intervals of about 3,500 yards (3,200 m) on the banks of the narrow stretches of the canal. Regimental HQ of 15th LAA Rgt was given responsibility under 2nd AA Bde for the 'Canal South' sector with its commanding officer (CO), Lieutenant-Colonel G.P. MacLellan, appointed AA Defence Commander (AADC).

=== East Africa ===
Meanwhile, 41 LAA Bty under Major G. Kniveton had been sent to the Sudan, where a limited offensive into Italian Eritrea was being prepared. On 5 February, soon after the advance began, the battery was deployed with Y Troop defending the Kassala railhead, Z Trp with the advancing force, and X Trp covering the field artillery of the column. Its other commitments were to protect tank 'harbours', Royal Air Force (RAF) landing grounds, and vulnerable infantry positions: the result was that the available guns were spread too thinly in 'penny packets', while the Regia Aeronautica was very active with low and medium level attacks on columns. However, even a small amount of AA fire was sometimes sufficient to deter an attack, and on 8 February Z Trp shot down a Savoia-Marchetti SM.79 Sparviero bomber. By 12 February, Y Trp had moved up from the railhead to Agordat, where the Italians had been driven out and the road opened. The British force then moved on towards Keren, where there were weeks of tough fighting in the mountains to clear the Dongolaas Gorge (the Battle of Keren). By 22 February, 41 LAA Bty HQ was under command of 4th Indian Division, with two guns detached to 10th Indian Infantry Brigade of 5th Indian Division, and Y Trp still at Agordat defending the airfield there. All the artillery, including 41 LAA Bty, suffered from counter-battery and harassing fire from the Italian guns. However, the RAF and South African Air Force had now established air superiority, and Italian air attacks (by obsolete Fiat CR.42s) became rarer. Finally, the infantry took the heights and allowed the mechanised column to break through the gorge on 26 March. Two days later, Keren had fallen and 41 LAA Bty was up with 5th Indian Division, two guns well forward with 11th Indian Infantry Brigade, and Z Trp was advancing up the Dongolaas Gorge. As the advance became a pursuit, 41 LAA Bty moved to the captured airfield at Asmara. The Italian forces in East Africa surrendered on 18 May. On 24 June, 41 LAA Bty sailed for Suez to rejoin 15th LAA Rgt at Beni Yusef in Egypt.

=== Crete ===
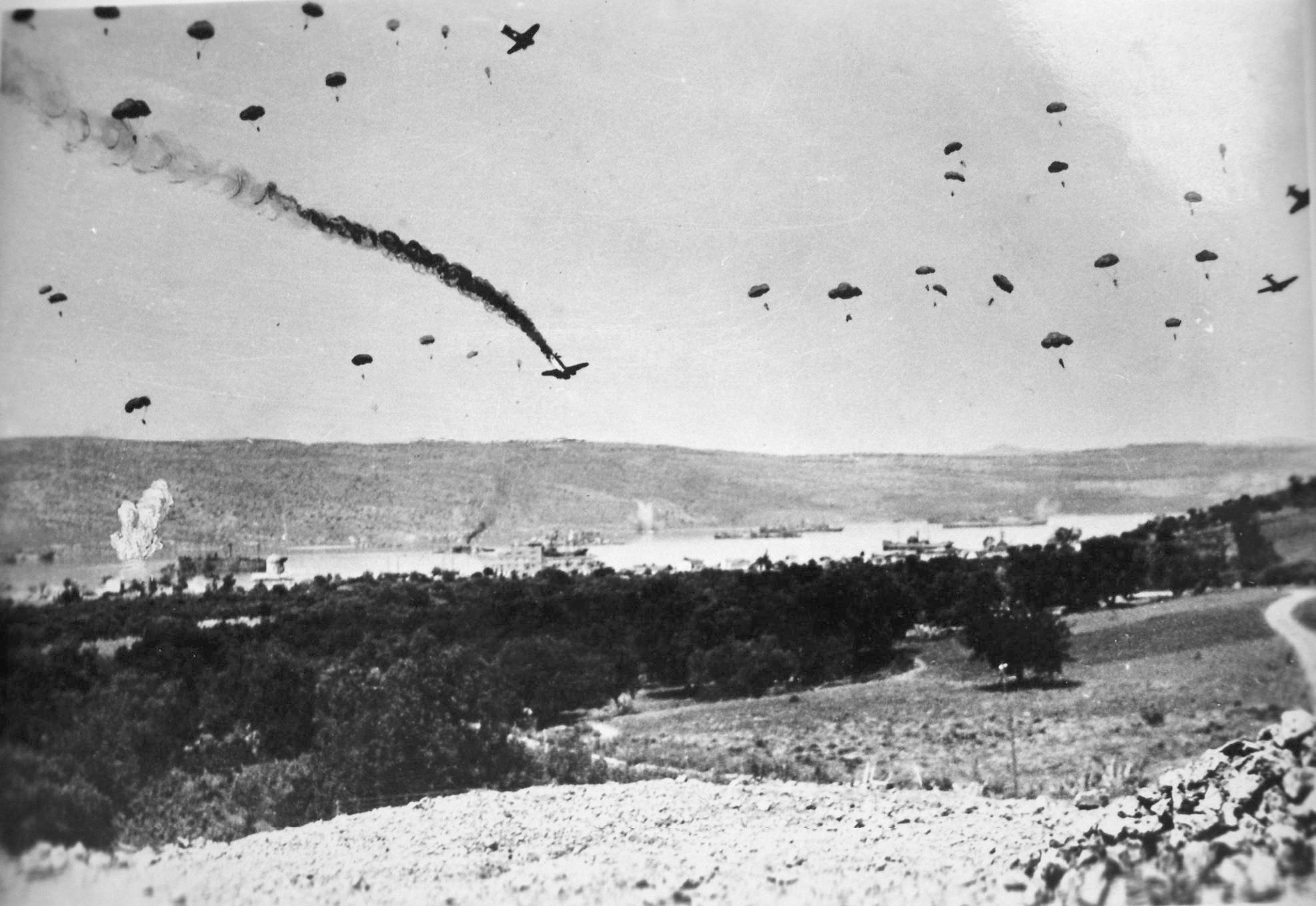
German paratroopers being dropped over Crete amid AA fire.

The regiment's third battery, 129 LAA Bty, went to Crete under Maj W.H. Cain in February 1941, where it was deployed with 11 Bofors guns in 'M Group' in the Suda–Canea Sector under RHQ 52nd (East Lancashire) LAA Rgt. The German invasion of Crete began in May 1941. The bases had been regularly dive-bombed in March and April, and heavy losses had been caused to the ships unloading at Suda Bay until AA guns were concentrated round the harbour. Then, the Luftwaffe began attacking the AA sites directly: 129 LAA Bty at Suda was attacked all day on 17 May, with Junkers Ju 88s and Messerschmitt Bf 109s trying to knock out individual guns. The prolonged action caused worn out barrels and broken parts, for which there were no spares, and eventually the battery had three of its guns out of action. When the German airborne assault began on 20 May, the AA sites were bombed for 30 minutes and some of the paratroopers were specifically tasked with knocking them out. Although German casualties in men and aircraft were heavy, German troop transports were able to use the captured airfield at Maleme, followed by landings from the sea. By 26 May, after continuous German attack from the air and by airborne troops, the defences round Canea finally collapsed and Suda had to be abandoned. The remaining AA units were ordered to destroy their equipment and move to Sfakia on the south coast. Parties of 129 LAA Bty began a 17 miles (27 km) march over the hills under air attack and while waiting for evacuation on the beach at Sfakia lost another 9 killed and 20 wounded to air attack. The Royal Navy evacuated as many as possible to Egypt, but thousands of British and Commonwealth troops were taken prisoner.

Only one officer and 40 men of 129 LAA Bty made it back to Egypt from Crete and the battery was not reformed; it was officially disbanded on 1 July 1941.

=== Western Desert ===
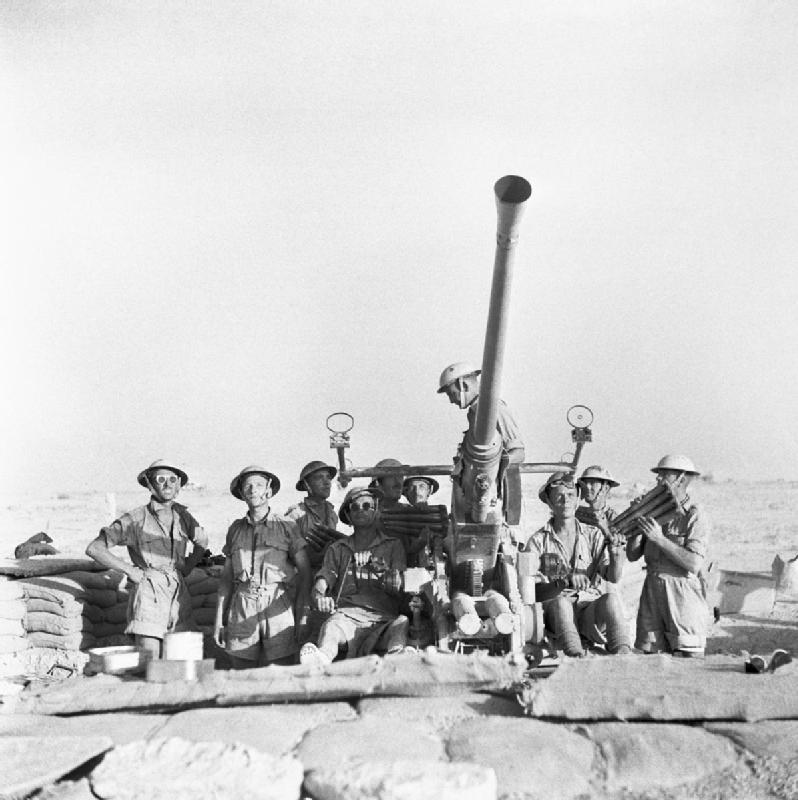
Bofors LAA gun in Libya, 6 June 1942.

Before 41 LAA Bty rejoined, 15th (IoM) LAA Rgt (RHQ and 42 LAA Bty) spent 9 to 21 February 1941 in 2nd Support Group of 2nd Armoured Division, which was working up in Egypt, but did not accompany that formation into Libya (where much of it was captured in April). The regiment and its two remaining batteries spent the rest of 1941 in Egypt. By October, it was back in 2nd AA Bde: one Trp of 41 LAA Bty (4 x Bofors) was in the Suez and Shallufa area, the remainder of 41 and 42 LAA Btys on the Canal with 20 x Bofors.

In early 1942, the Eighth Army was defending the Gazala Line, a series of fortified 'boxes', whose garrisons included AA guns under 12th AA Bde. The Battle of Gazala began on 26 May 1942. Eventually, Eighth Army was forced to evacuate the boxes and retreat towards Egypt. Tobruk was captured on 21 June. During the long retreat to the El Alamein position, 12th AA Bde under Brig Percy Calvert-Jones fell back in a series of rearguard actions at landing grounds (LGs), in the course of which it 'swept up' a sizeable body of AA units, including 15th LAA Rgt. Eighth Army seized upon this collection to act as a blocking force, giving Calvert-Jones two infantry brigades in addition. 'Calforce' held defensive positions at 10 LGs, providing its own artillery support from AA guns sited for ground tasks. It also developed dummy LGs, complete with fake AA positions. Calforce remained in position during the First Battle of El Alamein, and was not withdrawn from the front line until later in September.

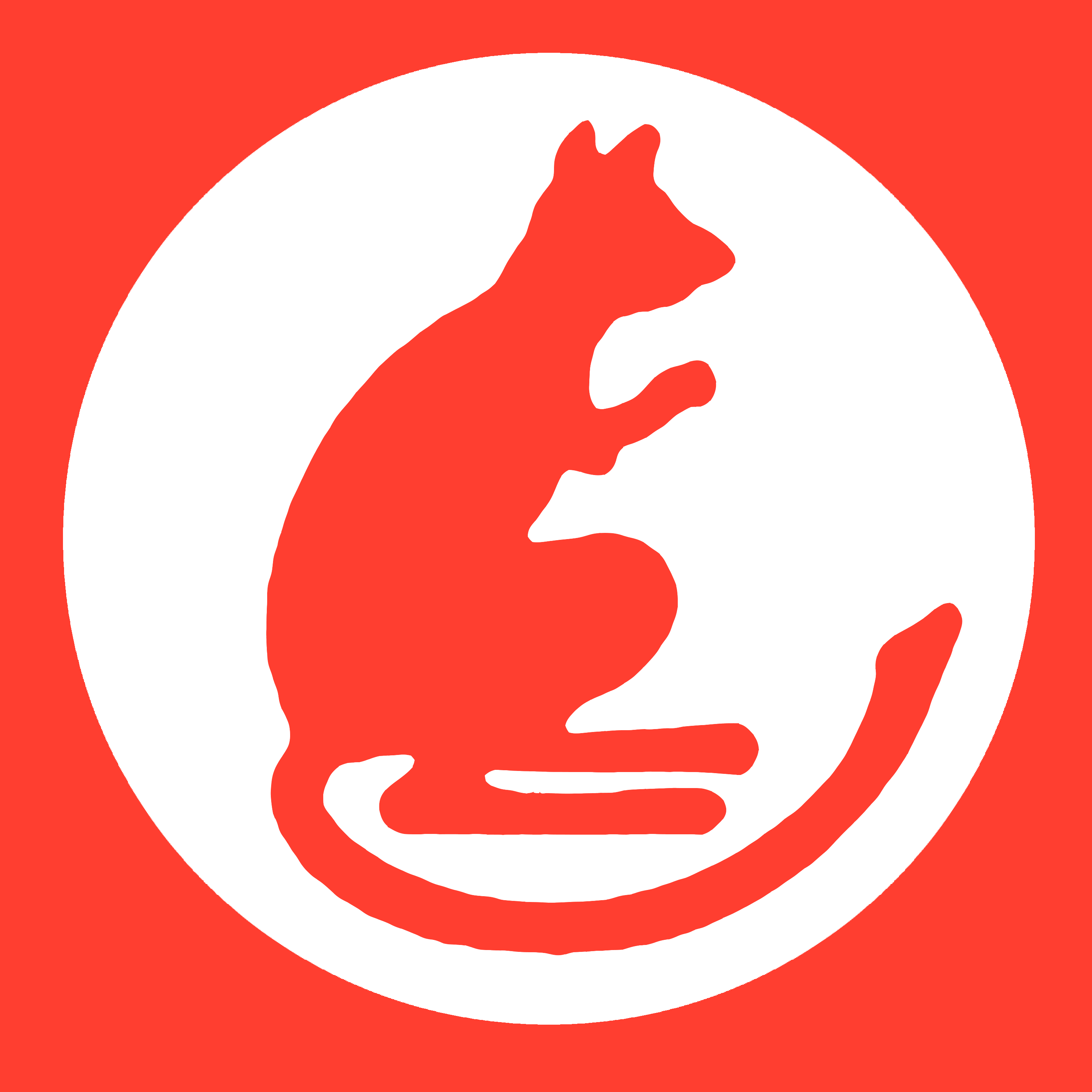
7th Armoured Division's 'Desert Rat' formation sign.

By then, 15th LAA Rgt had joined 7th Armoured Division (the 'Desert Rats') on 2 August 1942. It was reinforced by 1 LAA Bty, a Regular Army unit that had fought in the Battle of France and subsequently served as an independent battery in 7th Support Group and in the Tobruk garrison. (Note: This battery's transfer from 2nd LAA Rgt may not have been formalised until 27 October 1943.) 15th LAA Regiment remained with 7th Armoured Division as its air defence component from the Second Battle of Alamein until the end of the war.

=== Alamein ===
Careful consideration was given to AA defence during the build-up for Alamein. Instead of being deployed in circles around objectives, the LAA guns were sited on the attackers' likely lines of approach; opening fire would not give away the presence of a likely target, and numerous dummy and alternative positions were prepared. Within the divisions, the control of LAA batteries was decentralised to brigade level, and a feature of the assault planning was the integration of the LAA guns into ground fire tasks in support of infantry and armour. When the initial artillery bombardment began on the night of 23 October, LAA batteries switched from defending the assembly areas to firing Tracer ammunition to mark the attacking units' boundaries in the dust and darkness.

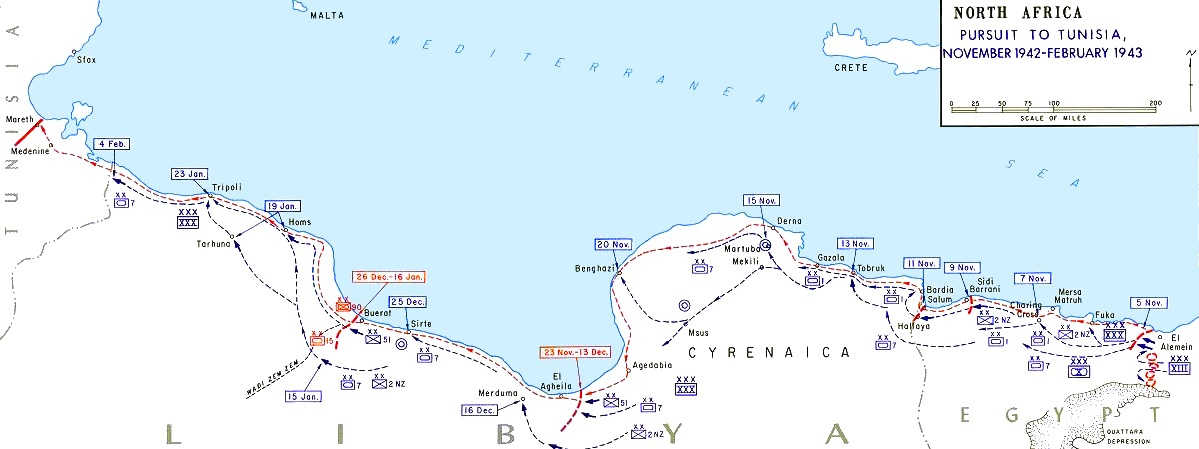
Eighth Army's route from Alamein to Medenine

7th Armoured Division's role in the opening phase at Alamein, Operation Lightfoot, was to breach the extensive minefields and penetrate the enemy's positions. Progress was slow on the first night, and a second attempt to break through the following night under bright moonlight led to heavy tank casualties. Then followed what Gen Bernard Montgomery called the 'Dogfight' phase, before the breakthrough was achieved by Operation Supercharge, for which 7th Armoured Division was switched to a new line of attack. By 4 November, the division had passed through and was pursuing the defeated Italian armour. The pursuit carried on via Halfaya Pass, the supporting arms following the tanks as far as petrol supplies would allow. By 14 November, 7th Armoured was operating with four light armoured columns, each provided with LAA and other artillery detachments, with transport taken from other units that had been 'grounded'. Fuel and Bofors ammunition was airlifted to these columns when the weather allowed. The Luftwaffe was equally hampered by fuel shortages and the air superiority enjoyed by the Desert Air Force: only a few aircraft appeared to strafe advancing British columns. 7th Armoured drove the enemy into their El Agheila position on 23 November, after a pursuit of roughly 800 miles (1,300 km).

In the Battle of El Agheila, beginning on 13 December, Eighth Army carried out a 'left hook' round the Axis forces, which set them retreating once more, and then launched 7th Armoured Division in pursuit. It was led by 4th Light Armoured Bde, including a Troop of 41 LAA Bty, all vehicles carrying petrol for 450 miles (720 km). The Axis retreated beyond Sirte to the Buerat position. On 15 January 1943, 7th Armoured Division carried out another left hook that helped turn the Axis forces out of the Buerat position, and on 23 January British troops entered Tripoli. By now LAA troops each had six Bofors, so the regiment's three batteries totalled 54 x Bofors guns.

=== Tunisia ===
7th Armoured Division was next in action at the Battle of Medenine on 6 March when the Axis forces attempted to disrupt Eighth Army's preparations to break through the Mareth Line into Tunisia. It also played a minor role in reserve during the Battle of Mareth (16–23 March), and in the pursuit after the Battle of Wadi Akarit (6–7 April). There was little interference from the Luftwaffe, which had been forced to evacuate its forward airfields. 7th Armoured Division provided a flank guard during the fighting at Enfidaville (19–29 April). In the rough country of Tunisia, the forward LAA units were often involved in 'snap' engagements against fast, low-flying air attacks. Increasingly, they discarded the LAA No 3 Kerrison Predictor and employed the simple 'Stiffkey Stick' deflection sight for the Bofors.

For the final advance on Tunis (Operations Vulcan and Strike), 7th Armoured Division was transferred form Eighth to First Army. Zero hour was 03.00 on 6 May, the armour began its advance at 07.30, and next day the leading troops entered Tunis. The Allies now had complete air superiority. The Axis forces in Tunisia surrendered on 12 May.

7th Armoured Division then moved back to Homs in Tripolitania to re-equip and re-train for amphibious operations and for fighting in closer terrain than the desert.

=== Italy ===
The division was a follow-up formation for Operation Avalanche, the assault landing at Salerno in Italy that began on 9 September 1943. The division landed by stages in the crowded beachhead, which was subjected to twice-daily air raids. It was not until 28 September that elements of the division were able to pass through the assault formations, and 30 September before the division was concentrated. Naples was liberated next day, but 7th Armoured bypassed the city and advanced towards the River Volturno against rearguards. Bad weather hampered the air forces on both sides.

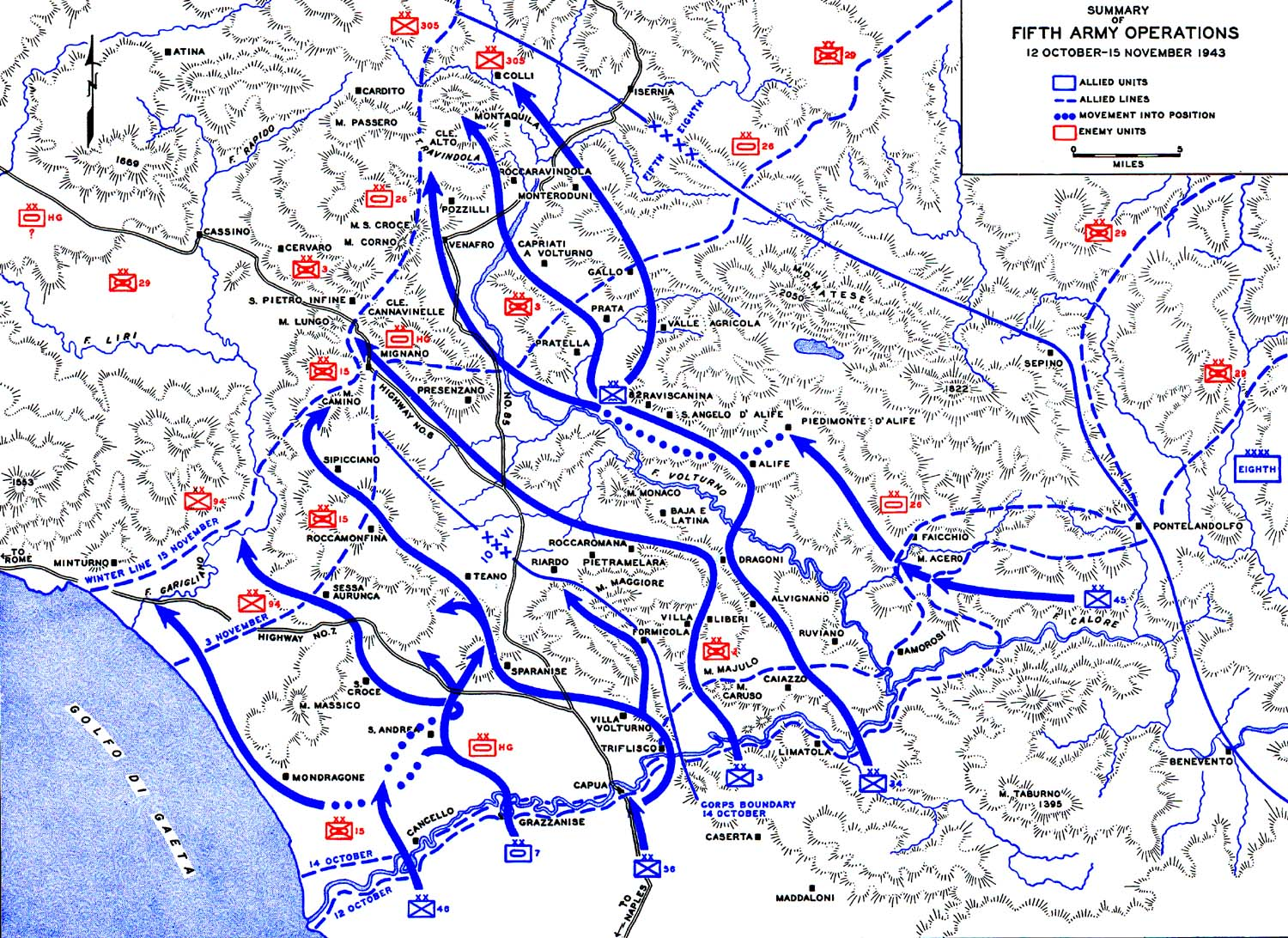
The Allies cross the Volturno Line.

The division's attempted to force a crossing of the Volturno Line were frustrated, and only an infantry bridgehead was obtained on 12 October, but this was enough to distract the enemy while other formations got across upstream. At the end of the month the division moved to the coast, where it found a suitable ford for tanks and crossed the mouth of the Agnena canal, outflanked Monte Massico and broke into the valley of the River Garigliano. This was the division's last action in the Italian campaign.

=== Overlord Training ===
7th Armoured Division was among the formations selected to be withdrawn with XXX Corps from the Italian Front to return to the UK to train for the Allied invasion of Normandy (Operation Overlord). It left Italy on 20 December 1943 and landed at Glasgow on 4 January 1944. It then began an extended period of re-equipment and training in the Thetford Heaths area of Norfolk.

On 14 March 1944, 15th LAA Rgt's three batteries (1, 41 and 42) were augmented to a strength of four troops each when 72–74 Trps joined from 341 LAA Bty of 103rd LAA Rgt, which had been broken up. This brought the establishment of Bofors guns up to 72, but before D-Day some LAA regiments. began exchanging Bofors for multiple-barrelled 20 mm guns (usually Oerlikons or Polstens). As an LAA unit attached to an armoured division, all the regiment's guns were on self-propelled (SP) mountings.

=== Normandy ===
In May 1944, the division moved from Norfolk to its assembly area close to the embarkation ports of Felixstowe, Tilbury Docks and London Docks. It embarked on 4 June and began landing on Gold Beach on 7 June (D + 1). For the first few days ashore, the division supported infantry actions by 50th (Northumbrian) Infantry Division, then on 10 June it began a push towards Tilly-sur-Seulles and Villers-Bocage in Operation Perch. On 13 June, as the division attempted to advance down secondary roads to the latter objective, its leading units were badly shot up in the Battle of Villers-Bocage and it was forced to withdraw. It then held off a German counter-attack, after which operations became static in the Bocage country. The division was withdrawn for rest on 1 July.

The Allies had achieved air superiority over the beachhead and so there had been little interruption of these operations by the Luftwaffe. With little call for AA defence, the AA units became increasingly used to supplement the divisional artillery to support ground operations. LAA units fired tracer to guide night attacks onto their objectives, and the Bofors guns were much in demand for infantry support. They could give useful close-range fire to help infantry working from cover to cover in the bocage; their rapid fire was good for suppressing enemy heavy weapons, the 40 mm round's sensitive percussion fuze providing an airburst effect among trees. It was also used for 'bunker-busting', though the lack of protection made the gun detachment vulnerable to return fire. LAA units also provided 'refuge strips' for air observation post aircraft spotting for the field guns: a Bofors troop deployed with Local Warning radar and ground observers could alert the pilot to the presence of enemy aircraft and provide protection for him.

7th Armoured Division's next major action was Operation Goodwood on 18 July, in which three armoured divisions under VIII Corps were to cross secretly to the east side of the River Orne and then thrust southwards past Caen deep into German-held territory. The 7th was the third division in the column, but played little part when the advance ran out of impetus once the leading tanks passed out of range of the supporting artillery, which was still west of the river because of congestion in the bridgehead. That night the Luftwaffe made one of its rare air raids, hitting the Orne bridgehead and causing damage among the rear echelons of the armoured divisions, though it encountered a large volume of British AA fire. The few German air sorties made next day while the British consolidated were ineffective.

There now followed another period of static warfare, with 7th Armoured occupying the reverse slope of a ridge south of Caen. Because there was little cover, the Luftwaffe carried out a large number of evening reconnaissance flights, 'of which quite a few were shot down or damaged by the concentrated fire of the light anti-aircraft Bofors', followed by small but effective night raids on the division's gun lines, ammunition dumps and headquarters. 7th Armoured was deployed to support II Canadian Corps's Operation Spring on 25 July and had some hard fighting at Tilly-la-Campagne.

The German front began to break up at the end of July. 7th Armoured Division reverted to XXX Corps, which was advancing south-eastwards from Caumont in Operation Bluecoat. On 31 July, the division began fighting its way towards Aunay, which took until 10 August, when the division was rested while other formations fought to close the Falaise Pocket.

7th Armoured Division was next switched to I Corps for the advance via Lisieux to the River Seine, which took until 28 August owing to determined German rearguards. On 31 August the division, now heading XII Corps, crossed the Seine through 53rd (Welsh) Infantry Division's bridgehead. It drove hard for the River Somme and on to its objective of Ghent, bypassing defended areas, forcing river and canal crossings and taking surrenders of German forces, including those at Ghent on 5 September. As the frontline divisions advanced, AA brigades followed up to take over responsibility for defending the river crossings.

=== Netherlands ===
7th Armoured Division played only a minor part in Operation Market Garden, the failed attempt by XXX Corps to use a 'carpet' of airborne forces to seize the crossing of the Nederrijn at Arnhem. Instead it was employed to clear the area round the vital supply port of Antwerp, rounding up rearguards and stragglers, but on 24 September it was moved to protect the long flank of XXX Corps' penetration to Nijmegen and to keep the road open. On 22 October XII Corps began Operation Pheasant, using 7th Armoured and 53rd (Welsh) Divisions to advance towards 's-Hertogenbosch, while 51st (Highland) and 15th (Scottish) Divisions advanced against Tilburg further south. The two towns were taken on 26 and 28 October respectively, opposition having been patchy. Divisional LAA units were now regularly being used to engage ground targets, or as flank guards with the divisional reconnaissance, anti-tank and machine gun units.

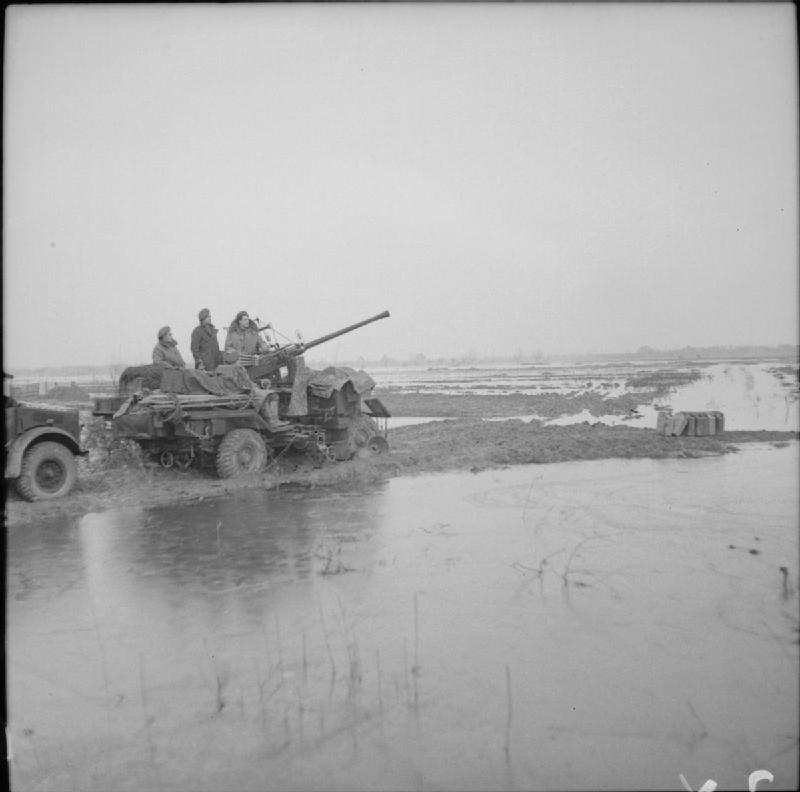
SP Bofors in Holland, December 1944.

7th Armoured Division spent the winter months holding the line along the River Maas, with some shelling, patrol actions and occasional diversionary attacks. Meanwhile, the Luftwaffe became more active in mid-December with fighter-bombers and reconnaissance aircraft in twos and threes, or larger bombing raids, such as one on Sittard on 16 December, when 15th LAA Rgt shot down two of the new Messerschmitt Me 262 jets. When the Luftwaffe launched its Operation Bodenplatte against Allied airfields on 1 January 1945, GHQ AA Troops for 21st Army Group reported that '40 mm LAA had the time of its life', and 15th LAA claimed a further seven jets.

Operation Blackcock began on 16 January, a well-rehearsed offensive designed to turn the enemy's positions and close up to the River Roer. The operation succeeded despite the winter weather, which hindered both side's aircraft until 22 January, and even then there was little sign of the Luftwaffe.

The division remained in position until 21 February with little activity apart from artillery exchanges, occasional patrol clashes and one 'spirited appearance of the Luftwaffe which inflicted no damage'. The division then went to Weert for rest, re-equipment and training. By this stage of the war, divisional LAA regiments had started to receive quadruple 0.5-inch Browning machine guns on SP mountings (the M51 Quadmount) in place of a proportion of their Bofors guns, to improve their capability against 'snap' attacks by the new German jet fighter-bombers. Under this arrangement, a troop comprised four SP Bofors and two SP quadruple Brownings.

=== Germany ===
The assault crossing of the Rhine, Operation Plunder, entailed a large and complex air defence plan. Although 7th Armoured Division was not involved in the initial assault, 15th LAA Rgt was one of the LAA units moved up close to the west bank where it was dug-in and carefully concealed in the 48 hours before D-Day. Their role was both to provide AA cover during the night and to take part in the initial 'Pepperpot', in which guns and mortars of all calibres saturated the enemy positions in front of the assaulting infantry. 15th (Scottish) Division, leading the assault for XII Corps, had over 700 guns of all types on call when the bombardment began at 23.30 on 23 March, which was followed by 'the start of the Divisional "Pepperpot" at 1 A.M. to swell the din in a mad crescendo and to criss-cross the darkness with the vivid red of anti-aircraft and anti-tank and machine-gun tracer'. The infantry set off across the river in amphibious Buffaloes at 02.00 on 24 March, and made rapid progress inland to link up with the airborne troops who landed during the morning (Operation Varsity). The Luftwaffe did virtually nothing during the assaults or during D-Day itself: only after nightfall did Junkers Ju 88s begin scattered divebombing attacks at medium and low level against the British bridging sites, artillery positions and supply routes. Some of these were engaged by searchlights and LAA guns. The number of attacks increased the following night and were maintained on the fourth night, but after that Second Army's exploitation was so deep that the Luftwaffe was forced to switch its attacks away from the Rhine to harassing the leading formations.

The rest of 7th Armoured Division was about 100 miles (160 km) away at Heeze, and did not concentrate near Geldern until 25 March. Its role was to cross once the bridgehead had been secured and heavy bridges had been built for the tanks. It began to cross the bridge at Xanten on the morning of 27 March, passed through the positions of 6th Airborne Division and began advancing against rearguards. After fighting its way through Stadtlohn on 30 March, the pace of the advance began to pick up: by 2 April, the division had advanced 120 miles (190 km). During Second Army's advance, the Luftwaffe attacked bridging sites, artillery positions and road movements. For the divisional LAA guns most of these involved 'snap' actions, against low-flying attackers using cloud cover, and often using jet aircraft. On 5 April, 7 Armoured Division's route was strafed by about a dozen Focke-Wulf Fw 190s and Me 262s, which inflicted little damage, and three of which were shot down.

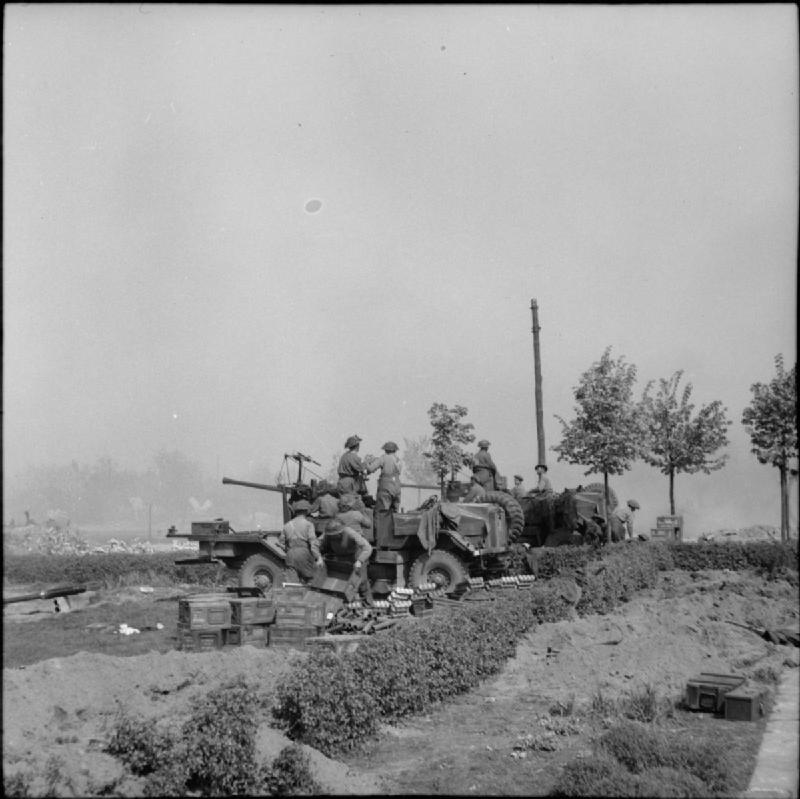
SP Bofors in action against German positions, April 1945.

The division entered Diepholz without opposition on 6 April, but found the bridges over the Weser 40 miles (64 km) further on had been blown. The division was therefore swung west towards Bremen in an effort to cut off retreating German forces. It crossed the Aller on 15 April and took the lead once more, bypassing Soltau and crossing Lüneburg Heath, fighting its way to the Elbe valley on 20 April. The division was now facing the defences of Hamburg, and spent the next few days clearing up the vast salient that it had captured. This area was full of German stragglers: a sergeant of 15th LAA Rgt encountered a group of German marines in woods within sight of Divisional HQ: one of the marines was wounded and the machine guns of the HQ tanks drove off the rest. The numbers of Luftwaffe attacks on the advancing British divisions peaked in the last week of the war before Hamburg surrendered to 7th Armoured Division on 3 May, followed by the German surrender at Lüneburg Heath next day.

After VE Day, the units of 21st Army Group were engaged in occupation duties, disarming German troops and administering the British Zone of Allied-occupied Germany. 15th LAA Regiment remained in Hamburg when a large part of 7th Armoured Division moved to Berlin in June and July for victory parades. Demobilisation began in late 1945. By 4 February 1946, 1 LAA Bty left to help reform 2nd LAA Rgt in the postwar Regular Army. Then on 25 February RHQ, 41 and 42 LAA Btys went into suspended animation pending the reorganisation of the TA.

== Postwar ==
When the TA was reconstituted on 1 January 1947, the regiment was reformed as 515 (Isle of Man) LAA Rgt. It formed part of 59 AA Brigade headquartered at Liverpool.

AA Command was abolished on 10 March 1955 and there were wholesale disbandments among its units: 515 LAA Rgt survived as 42 Division Counter-Bombardment (Isle of Man) Staff Troop (42nd (Lancashire) Division being the postwar TA formation in the region). However, when there were further cuts to the TA in 1961, it was merged into 288 (2nd West Lancashire) LAA Rgt.

== Insignia ==
A regimental arm badge was authorised in 1950 consisting of three conjoined armoured legs in silver on a red shield (the Coat of arms of the Isle of Man).

== Memorial ==
There is a memorial plaque to the regiment in the Royal Chapel of St John the Baptist at St John's in the parish of German, IoM.

== Museum ==
Until 2005 the Old Comrades of the Regiment ran a museum at Tromode, but their exhibits are now displayed at the Manx Aviation and Military Museum at Castletown.

== See also ==
- Manx Fencible Corps 1779–1783
- Royal Manx Fencibles 1793–1811
- Isle of Man Volunteers 1860–1920

== Bibliography ==
- John Buckley, Monty's Men: The British Army and the Liberation of Europe, London: Yale University Press, 2013, ISBN 978-0-300-13449-0.
- Maj L.F. Ellis, History of the Second World War, United Kingdom Military Series: Victory in the West, Vol I: The Battle of Normandy, London: HM Stationery Office, 1962/Uckfield: Naval & Military, 2004, ISBN 1-845740-58-0.
- Maj L.F. Ellis, History of the Second World War, United Kingdom Military Series: Victory in the West, Vol II: The Defeat of Germany, London: HM Stationery Office, 1968/Uckfield: Naval & Military, 2004, ISBN 1-845740-59-9.
- Gen Sir Martin Farndale, History of the Royal Regiment of Artillery: The Years of Defeat: Europe and North Africa, 1939–1941, Woolwich: Royal Artillery Institution, 1988/London: Brasseys, 1996, ISBN 1-85753-080-2.
- Frederick, J.B.M. (1984). Lineage Book of British Land Forces 1660–1978. Wakefield, Yorkshire: Microform Academic Publishers. ISBN 1-85117-009-X.
- Michael Glover, An Improvised War: The Abyssinian Campaign of 1940–1941, London: Leo Cooper, 1987, ISBN 0-85052-241-2.
- Lt-Gen Sir Brian Horrocks, A Full Life, London: Collins, 1960.
- Joslen, Lt-Col H.F. (2003) [1st. Pub. HMSO:1960]. Orders of Battle, United Kingdom and Colonial Formations and Units in the Second World War, 1939–1945. Uckfield: Naval & Military Press. ISBN 1-843424-74-6.
- John Keegan, Six Armies in Normandy, From D-Day to the Liberation of Paris, London: Jonathan Cape 1982/Penguin 1983, ISBN 0-1400-5293-3.
- Capt Martin Lindsay and Capt M..E. Johnstone, History of 7th Armoured Division June 1943–July 1945, British Army of the Rhine, 1945.
- Norman E.H. Litchfield, The Territorial Artillery 1908–1988 (Their Lineage, Uniforms and Badges), Nottingham: Sherwood Press, 1992, ISBN 0-9508205-2-0.
- Lt-Gen H.G. Martin, The History of the Fifteenth Scottish Division 1939–1945, Edinburgh: Blackwood, 1948/Uckfield: Naval & Military Press, 2014, ISBN 978-1-78331-085-2.
- Brig C.J.C. Molony,History of the Second World War, United Kingdom Military Series: The Mediterranean and Middle East, Vol V: The Campaign in Sicily 1943 and the Campaign in Italy 3rd September 1943 to 31st March 1944, London: HM Stationery Office, 1973/Uckfield, Naval & Military Press, 2004, ISBN 1-845740-69-6.
- The Memoirs of Field Marshal Viscount Montgomery of Alamein, London: Collins, 1958.
- Maj-Gen I.S.O. Playfair, History of the Second World War, United Kingdom Military Series: The Mediterranean and Middle East, Vol I: The Early Successes against Italy (to May 1941), London: HM Stationery Office, 1954/Uckfield, Naval & Military Press, 2004 ISBN 1-845740-65-3.
- Maj-Gen I.S.O. Playfair, History of the Second World War, United Kingdom Military Series: The Mediterranean and Middle East, Vol II: The Germans come to the aid of their Ally (1941), London: HM Stationery Office, 1956/Uckfield, Naval & Military Press, 2004 ISBN 1-845740-66-1.
- Maj-Gen I.S.O. Playfair & Brig C.J.C. Molony, History of the Second World War, United Kingdom Military Series: The Mediterranean and Middle East, Vol IV: The Destruction of the Axis forces in Africa, London: HM Stationery Office, 1966/Uckfield, Naval & Military Press, 2004, ISBN 1-845740-68-8.
- Brig N.W. Routledge, History of the Royal Regiment of Artillery: Anti-Aircraft Artillery 1914–55, London: Royal Artillery Institution/Brassey's, 1994, ISBN 1-85753-099-3
