= Isle of Man Volunteers =

British military unit

Isle of Man Volunteers 7th (Isle of Man) Volunteer Battalion, King's (Liverpool Regiment)
- Active: 29 September 1860 – 3 March 1920
- Country: United Kingdom
- Branch: Volunteer Force
- Type: Infantry
- Size: 1–3 Companies
- Part of: King's (Liverpool Regiment)
- Peacetime HQ: Douglas
- Engagements: Second Boer War; World War I

The Isle of Man Volunteers was a nominal battalion of Britain's Volunteer Force formed during the 1860s and disbanded in 1920. Its service companies saw active service in the Second Boer War and World War I. During its existence, the battalion had the distinction of being the only representative of the Isle of Man in the British Army, and the last Volunteer Force unit.

== Early history ==
Amidst rising tensions between the United Kingdom and France, a perceived threat of invasion by the much larger French Army, and a British Army stretched with imperial commitments, the Volunteer Force began to take shape from May 1859 as a citizen army of part-time rifle, artillery and engineer volunteer corps. (Note: Corps in this context meaning a body of troops, rather than a large military formation composed of two or more divisions.)

The Isle of Man's first volunteers appeared on 29 September 1860 when three independent Rifle Volunteer Corps (RVCs) were formed:

- 1st (Castletown and Foxdale) Isle of Man RVC, formed on 29 September 1860; headquarters (HQ) moved to Ballasalla in 1867; it was disbanded on 14 July 1870
- 2nd (Douglas) Isle of Man RVC, formed on 29 September 1860
- 3rd (Ramsey Rifles) Isle of Man RVC, formed on 29 September 1860; disbanded after June 1869

Two Manx Artillery Volunteer Corps (AVCs) were also formed at this time:

- 1st (Douglas) Isle of Man AVC, formed on 15 February 1861; a second battery was authorised in 1861 but not formed until 1869–70; disbanded in 1875
- 2nd (Laxey) Isle of Man AVC, formed on 29 June 1864; disbanded after December 1872

From July 1861, the "Major Commanding the Volunteer Forces in the Island" was Francis Pigott Stainsby Conant, Lieutenant Governor of the Isle of Man from 1860 to 1863. The RVCs were attached to the 64th (Liverpool Irish) Lancashire RVC, (Note: Later designated as the 8th (Liverpool Irish) Battalion, The King's (Liverpool Regiment).) the 1st AVC to the 1st Administrative Brigade, Cheshire Artillery Volunteer Corps from 1873 until its disbandment.

A further RVC was later added:

- 4th (Crosby) Isle of Man RVC, formed on 24 April 1866; disbanded in March 1870

When the RVCs were consolidated on 1 March 1880 the surviving 2nd RVC was redesignated as the 1st Isle of Man RVC, at which time it was attached to the 15th Lancashire RVC based in Liverpool. (Note: Later designated as the 7th Battalion, The King's (Liverpool Regiment) and later still as 40th Royal Tank Regiment.) The following year, as part of the Childers Reforms, the RVCs were affiliated to their local Regular Army unit, the 1st IoM RVC became a volunteer battalion of the King's (Liverpool Regiment) on 1 July 1881. In 1884 the unit was attached to the 19th (Liverpool Press Guard) Lancashire Rifle Volunteer Corps (later designated as the 6th Volunteer Battalion, King's (Liverpool Regiment)) for administrative purposes. It was formally redesignated as 7th (Isle of Man) Volunteer Battalion, King's (Liverpool Regiment) on 1 March 1888 (although it was only one company strong).

A detachment of nine men accompanied the 6th VB King's to South Africa during the Second Boer War, winning the Isle of Man Volunteers their first Battle Honour

== Territorial Force ==
The Territorial Force (TF) was formed on 1 April 1908 following the enactment of the Territorial and Reserve Forces Act 1907 (7 Edw. 7. c. 9) which combined and re-organised the old Volunteer Force, the Honourable Artillery Company and the Yeomanry. However, the terms of the Act did not extend to the Isle of Man. Therefore, the 7th Battalion was the only volunteer battalion that did not move to the TF and it remained as the last volunteer force unit in the British Army. A battalion in name only, it had a strength of just a single company, headquartered at Douglas. It was part of the King's (Liverpool Regiment) and attached to the TF's West Lancashire Division.

== World War I ==
On the outbreak of war on 4 August 1914, the 7th (Isle of Man) Volunteer Battalion was initially employed on guard duties. No. 2 Company was formed on 29 August 1914 and a third on 22 December 1914. With the formation of the Service Company on 6 March 1915, the remaining men in these three companies were formed into a new company which guarded the prisoner of war camp at Douglas until December 1916 when it was demobilized.

The 1st Manx (Service) Company was formed in 1915 and posted to the 16th (Reserve) Battalion, The King's (Liverpool Regiment). The 16th King's was formed at Hoylake in December 1914 as a service battalion in the original 35th Division of Kitchener's Fourth New Army (K4). The K4 divisions were broken up on 10 April 1915 to provide replacements for the first three New Armies. The 16th King's became a 2nd Reserve battalion to supply reinforcement drafts to the service battalions of the King's when they went overseas. In July 1915 the battalion moved to Kinmel Camp in North Wales.

In October 1915, the 1st Manx (S) Company transferred to the 3rd (Reserve) Battalion, Cheshire Regiment at Birkenhead. This was a Special Reserve (formerly Militia) unit, whose role was to provide reinforcement drafts to the regiment's two Regular battalions. The company was sent to join 2nd Bn Cheshires, which was serving at Salonika. The company joined as A Company on 12 January 1916.

2nd Cheshires was part of 84th Brigade in 28th Division, stationed in the Struma Valley. On 2 October 1916 84th Bde occupied Mazirko and on 31 October 2nd Cheshires held the village of Ormanli while 83rd Brigade used it as a jumping-off point to capture Bairakli Jum'a. Although conditions were harsh and sickness prevalent, the Salonika front was relatively passive for long periods. It was not until the following May that 28th Division took 'Ferdie' and 'Essex' Trenches near Bairakli Jum'a, and 16 October 1917 when it completed the capture of Bairakli and Kumli. The climax came at the Battle of Doiran (18–19 September 1918), when the 2nd Cheshires attacked Dervishli, getting ahead of the Greek Crete Division alongside and having to be pulled back at the end of the first day. Although the attack at Doiran did not achieve a breakthrough, the Bulgarian Army was beaten all along the front, and by 21 September was streaming away up the Vardar and Strumica Valleys. 28th Division took part in the pursuit up to the Strumica Valley.

Bulgaria concluded an Armistice with the Allies on 30 September. This was followed on 30 October by the Armistice of Mudros with the Ottoman Empire, under the terms of which 28th Division was sent by sea to occupy the Dardanelles forts. It disembarked on 12 November and 84th Bde moved to the Gallipoli–Bulair area. In March 1919 it moved to the Haidar Pasha area of Constantinople. A year later 2nd Cheshires was still in Turkey as part of the occupation forces, but by then the wartime personnel had been demobilised.

A second service company was formed on 27 November 1915 at Bidston Camp near Birkenhead. It was later broken up to supply drafts for France.

All three companies were disbanded on 3 March 1920.

== Successor units ==
The Territorial Army underwent rapid expansion during the period of international tension preceding World War II, and among the new units created was 15th (Isle of Man) Light Anti-Aircraft Regiment, Royal Artillery, formed at Douglas on 1 July 1938. During the war its batteries served in the Western Desert campaign, the East African Campaign and the defence of Crete (where most of a battery was captured). Later it became the air defence regiment for the famous 7th Armoured Division (the 'Desert Rats') fighting its way across North Africa to Tunisia and Italy before participating in the Normandy campaign (Operation Overlord) and the advance across North West Europe to Germany. After the war the regiment was reformed as 515th (Isle of Man) Light Anti-Aircraft Regiment, Royal Artillery. It was later merged into 288th (2nd West Lancashire) Light Anti-Aircraft Regiment.

A new unit of the Army Reserve was established in the Isle of Man in 2015.

== Battle honours ==
During its existence, the Isle of Man Volunteers earned one Battle Honour: South Africa 1900–1902. It also shared those of the King's Regiment.

== See also ==
- Manx Fencible Corps 1779–1783
- Royal Manx Fencibles 1793–1811
- Manx Regiment 1938–1955
- Volunteer Force (Great Britain)

== Bibliography ==
- Maj A.F. Becke,History of the Great War: Order of Battle of Divisions, Part 1: The Regular British Divisions, London: HM Stationery Office, 1934/Uckfield: Naval & Military Press, 2007, ISBN 1-847347-38-X.
- Maj A.F. Becke,History of the Great War: Order of Battle of Divisions, Part 3b: New Army Divisions (30–41) and 63rd (R.N.) Division, London: HM Stationery Office, 1939/Uckfield: Naval & Military Press, 2007, ISBN 1-847347-41-X.
- Ian F.W. Beckett, Riflemen Form: A Study of the Rifle Volunteer Movement 1859–1908, Aldershot: Ogilby Trusts, 1982, ISBN 0 85936 271 X.
- Brig E.A. James, British Regiments 1914–18, London: Samson Books, 1978/Uckfield: Naval & Military Press, 2001, ISBN 978-1-84342-197-9.
- Gen Sir Martin Farndale, History of the Royal Regiment of Artillery: The Years of Defeat: Europe and North Africa, 1939–1941, Woolwich: Royal Artillery Institution, 1988/London: Brasseys, 1996, ISBN 1-85753-080-2.
- J.B.M. Frederick, Lineage Book of British Land Forces 1660–1978, Vol I, Wakefield: Microform Academic, 1984, ISBN 1-85117-007-3.
- J.B.M. Frederick, Lineage Book of British Land Forces 1660–1978, Vol II, Wakefield: Microform Academic, 1984, ISBN 1-85117-009-X.
- Joslen, H. F. (2003) [1960]. Orders of Battle: Second World War, 1939–1945. Uckfield, East Sussex: Naval and Military Press. ISBN 978-1-84342-474-1.
- Norman Litchfield & Ray Westlake, The Volunteer Artillery 1859–1908 (Their Lineage, Uniforms and Badges), Nottingham: Sherwood Press, 1982, ISBN 0-9508205-0-4.
- Norman E.H. Litchfield, The Territorial Artillery 1908–1988 (Their Lineage, Uniforms and Badges), Nottingham: Sherwood Press, 1992, ISBN 0-9508205-2-0.
- Sargeaunt MVO OBE, B.E. (1922). The Isle of Man and the Great War. Douglas, Isle of Man: Brown & Sons, Limited.
- Edward M. Spiers, The Army and Society 1815–1914, London: Longmans, 1980, ISBN 0-582-48565-7.
- Alan Wakefield and Simon Moody, Under the Devil's Eye: Britain's Forgotten Army at Salonika 1915–1918, Stroud: Sutton, 2004, ISBN 0-7509-3537-5.
