= Thetford Heaths =

Protected area in Suffolk, England

Coordinates: 52.39°N 0.72°E

- Site of Special Scientific Interest
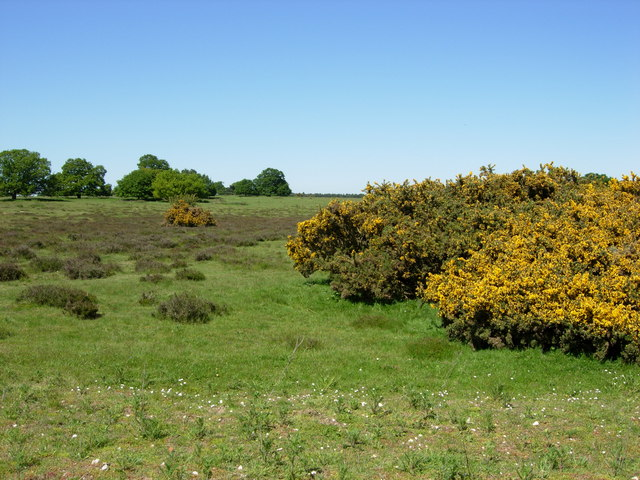
- Location of Thetford Heaths.
- Area of search: Suffolk
- Grid reference: TL 851 801
- Interest: Biological; Geological
- Area: 270.6 hectares
- Notification date: 1993
- Location map: Magic Map

Thetford Heaths is a 270.6-hectare (669-acre) biological and geological Site of Special Scientific Interest in Suffolk. It is a Nature Conservation Review site, Grade I, and parts of it are a national nature reserve, and a Geological Conservation Review, It is part of the Breckland Special Area of Conservation, and Special Protection Area A large part of this dry heathland site is calcareous grassland, and some areas are grazed by sheep or rabbits. There are several nationally rare plants and an uncommon heathland bird, and many lichens and mosses.

== The site ==
Thetford Heaths is an area of dry heathland in the Breckland. A range of soil types gives rise to areas of a variety of grassland types including calcareous, neutral and acidic, as well as scrubland and regenerating deciduous woodland. Part of the site is owned by the Norfolk Naturalists Trust and is managed as the Thetford Heath National Nature Reserve, and part is used for training purposes by the army. The calcareous grassland is grazed in places by sheep and is dominated by sheep’s fescue, crested hair-grass and meadow oat-grass. In the shortest, rabbit-nibbled turf, there may be little grass, and small herbs such as purple milkvetch, early forget-me-not and little mouse-ear may predominate, along with lichens. Longer grassy areas have such plants as bird's-foot trefoil, lesser meadow-rue, lady’s bedstraw and small scabious. Where they can get a foothold, annual species such as common whitlowgrass, thyme-leaved sandwort and shepherd’s cress occur. Other areas of heathland are dominated by heather, and lichens and mosses.

Birds of importance in the Breckland include the Eurasian stone-curlew, the European nightjar and the woodlark.

== Land ownership ==
Part of the land within Thetford Heaths SSSI is owned by the Ministry of Defence.
