= Austin K2/Y =

Austin K2/Y Ambulance
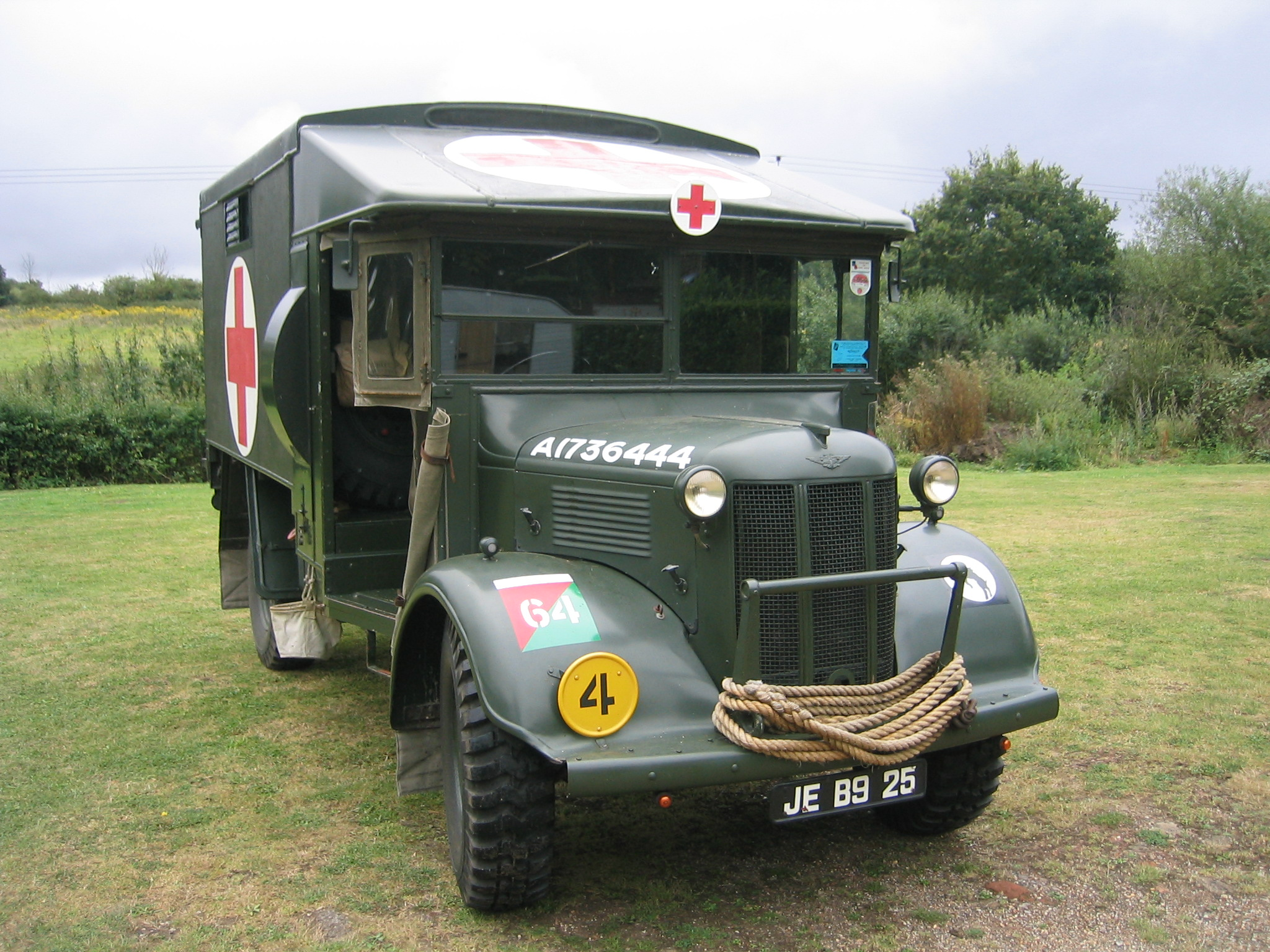
- An original fully restored Austin K2/Y ambulance
- Type: Military ambulance
- Place of origin: UK

Service history
- In service: Second World War and after in a number of countries

Production history
- Manufacturer: Austin and Mann Egerton
- Produced: 1939–1945
- No. built: 13,102

Specifications
- Mass: 3 tons 1½ cwt (3124 kg) (dry)
- Length: 18 ft (5.49 m)
- Width: 7 ft 5 in (2.26 m)
- Height: 9 ft 2 in (2.79 m)
- Crew: 2 – 3
- Armour: None
- Engine: 6-cylinder 3462 cc Austin D-Series petrol engine 60 hp at 3000 rpm 153 lb_{f}ft 207.4 Nm torque at 1200 rpm)
- Payload capacity: 4 stretchers or 10 "walking wounded"
- Suspension: Wheels 4×2, 10.50–16 tyres
- Maximum speed: 50 mph (80 km/h)

The Austin K2/Y is a British heavy military ambulance that was used by all Commonwealth services during the Second World War.

Built by Austin, it was based on the 1938 Austin K30 30-cwt light truck which, as the K2 chassis, was built during the war for many uses.

== Design ==
The K2/Y could take ten casualties sitting or four stretcher cases. The rear body, known as No. 2 Mk I/L was developed by the Royal Army Medical Corps and built by coachbuilder Mann Egerton. Simple canvas closures were used in place of driver's cab doors.

The interior dimensions were approximately 2.6 metres long, 2.0 metres wide and 1.7 metres high. At the rear of the vehicle there were two large doors. From the driver's cab the wounded could also be accessed through a small internal door with a seat. The exterior was mainly made from painted canvas.

The Austin K2/Y was generally regarded as having a widely spaced four-speed gearbox that needed to be "understood", but once mastered provided good service. It had two petrol tanks, one on each side (total capacity: approx. 2×12 Imperial gallons (2×54.5 L)). The top speed was around 50 mph (80 km/h).

A total of 13,102 Austin K2/Y ambulances were built at the company's Longbridge plant almost continuously from 1940 until the war ended. An estimated 50 or more remain today. The Austin chassis was one of three main designs fitted with variations of the Mann Egerton built bodies, the others being Morris Commercial CS11/30F and Bedford ML 54. It is estimated there are two remaining Morris Commercials, but no Bedford examples are said to survive.

== Service ==
One veteran of the North African Campaign stated he once managed to carry 27 wounded, with passengers seated on the wings, bonnet, rear steps, and in extra stretchers suspended by rifles across the rear walkway; he was mentioned in dispatches for this feat.

Princess Elizabeth was trained to drive one during WW2 when serving with the Auxiliary Territorial Service.

The design was popular with British and Commonwealth troops, as well as American forces which received them in reverse Lend-Lease. The K2 (KTwo) was often affectionately nicknamed "Katy", also by British and US troopers in occupied Germany of the 1950s.

The K2/Y ambulance was also used in the Korean War.

== Variants ==
There were two versions of this ambulance: The early version had two round rotary ventilators on the roof and a spare wheel cover with a large hump. The late version had two square fixed vents on the roof and a spare-wheel cover with a much smaller and rounder hump. The spare wheel was moved further into the body to stop drivers hitting the cover (and wheel) when passing other vehicles. The later version also had a larger cut-out in the internal door.

== In media ==
A K2/Y had a central role in the 1958 film Ice Cold in Alex (a WW II drama) featuring John Mills, Sylvia Syms, Anthony Quayle and Harry Andrews. The film is based on the novel of the same name (1957) by British author Christopher Landon. The vehicle used in that film was a one-off special conversion made for the film using a 4-wheel drive Canadian Military Pattern chassis. The standard 2WD K2 would not have been capable of some of the film "stunts". Three Austin K2/Y ambulances participated in the VE–VJ days 50th anniversary parade down the Mall in London on 19 August 1995.

== Gallery ==
=== Exterior and interior ===
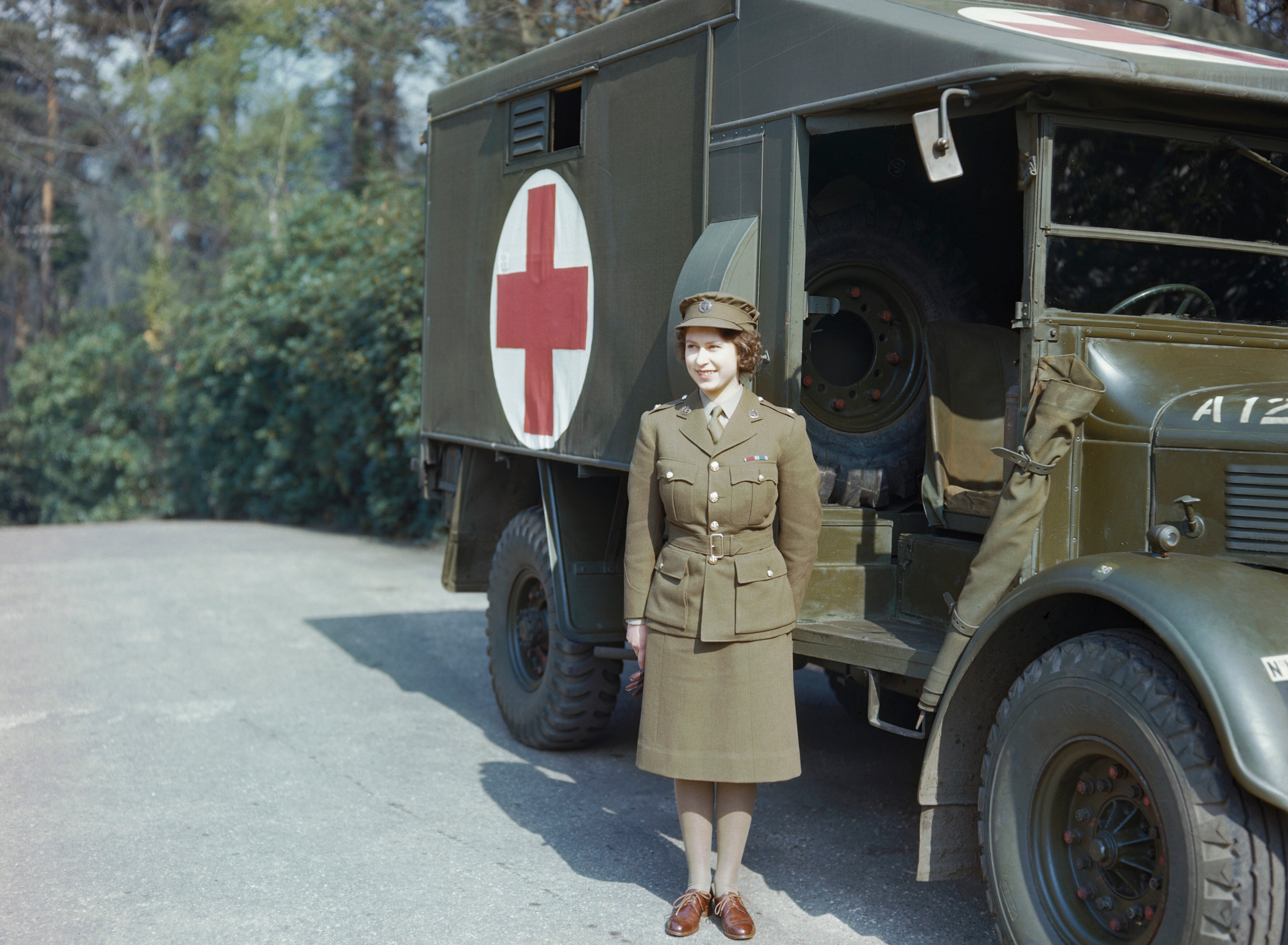
Princess Elizabeth in the Auxiliary Territorial Service (ATS) in front of an Austin K2/Y Ambulance, April 1945.

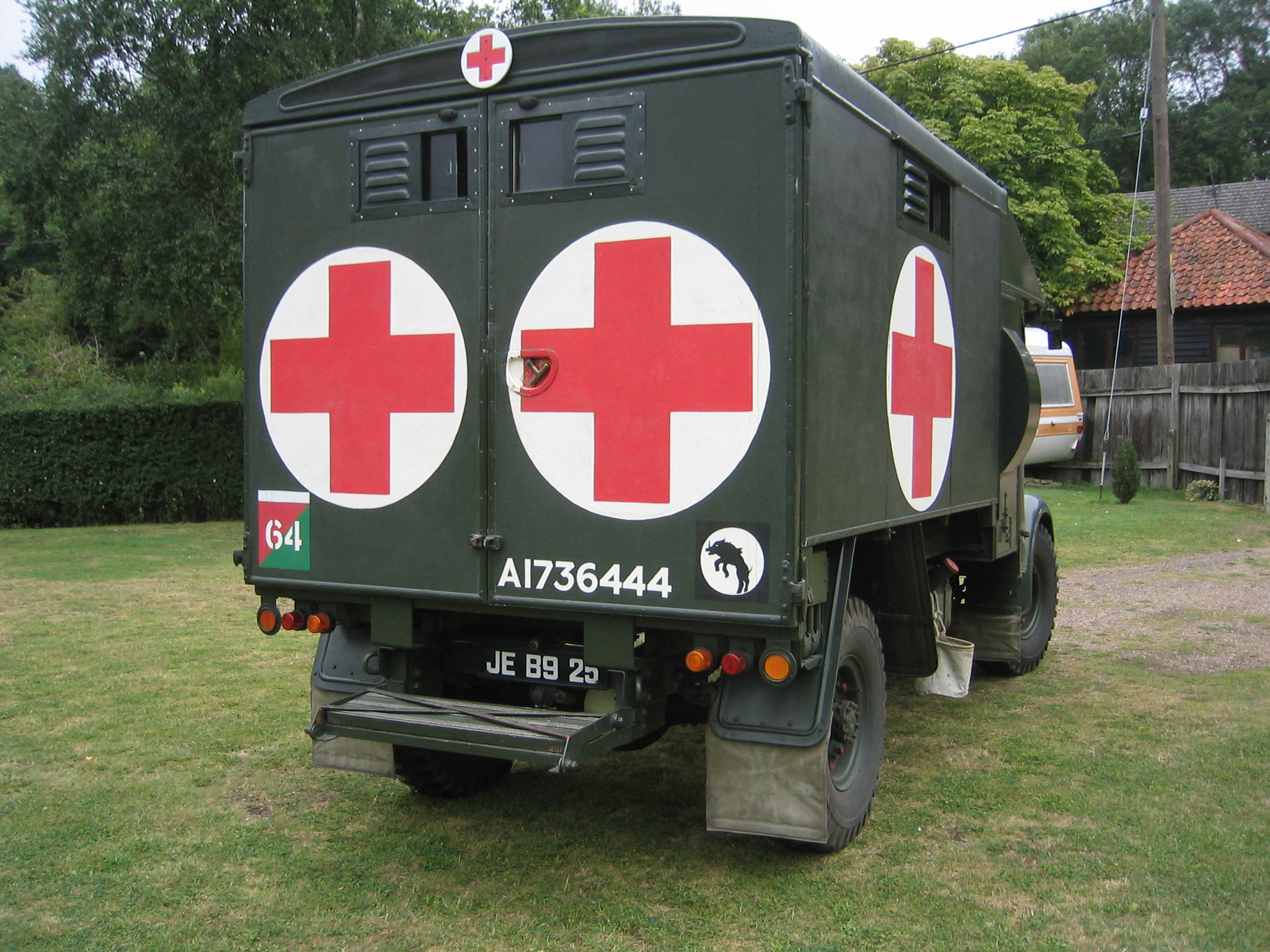
Rear of an Austin K2/Y Ambulance. Note the bulge for the spare wheel.

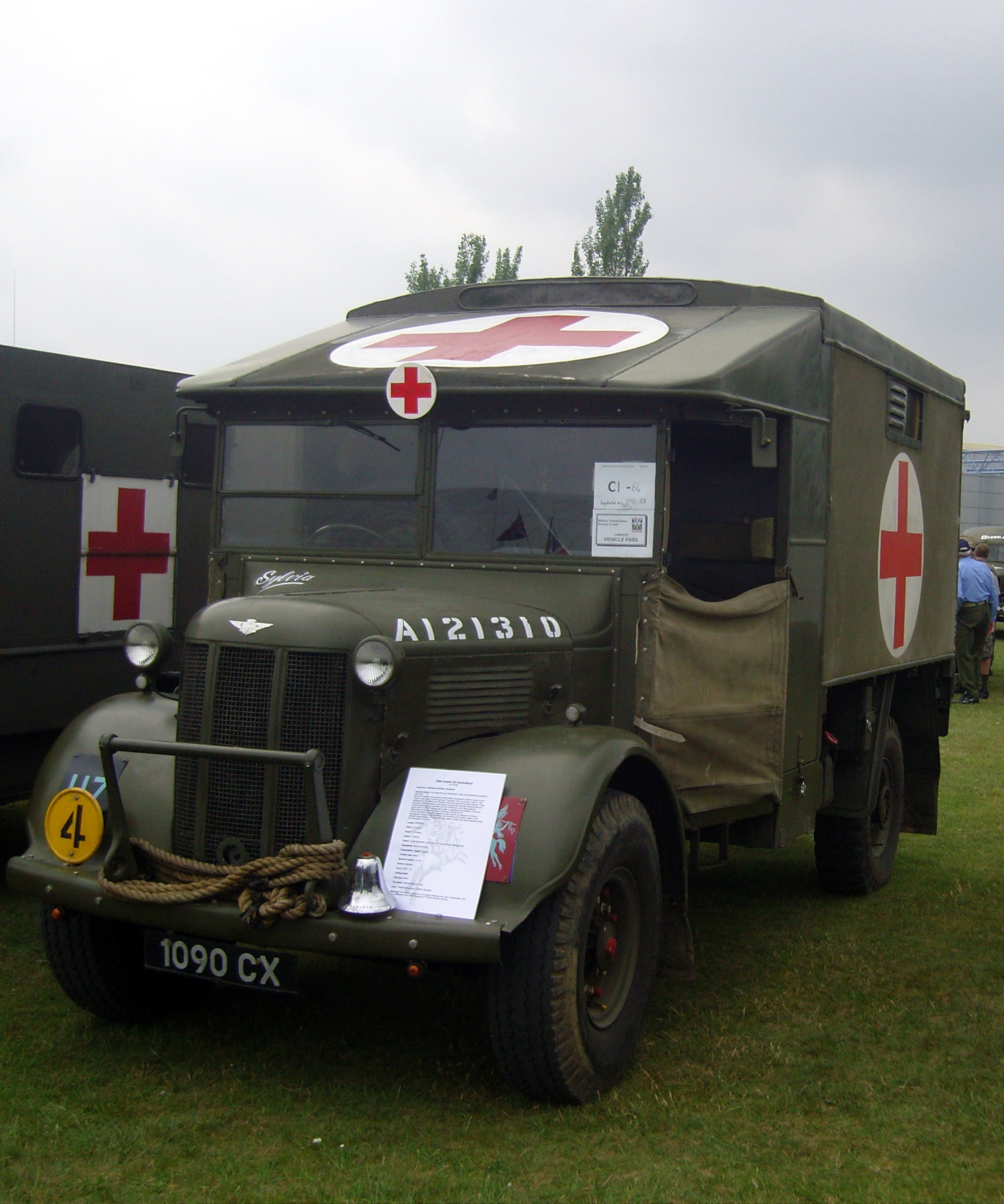
Austin K2/Y Ambulance at the Duxford Military Vehicles Show 6 June 2010.

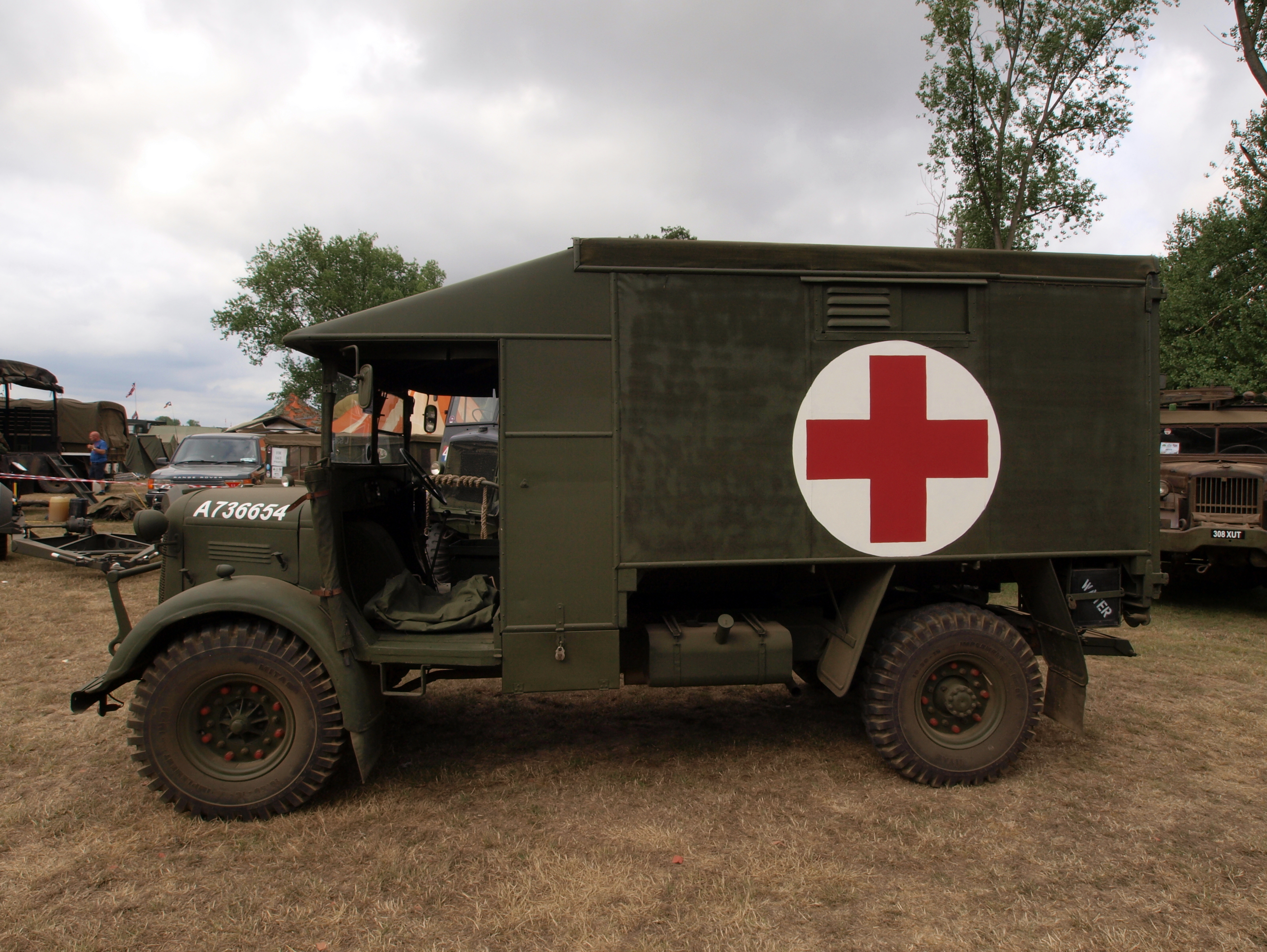
Sideview of an Austin K2/Y Ambulance at the War and Peace show 2010.

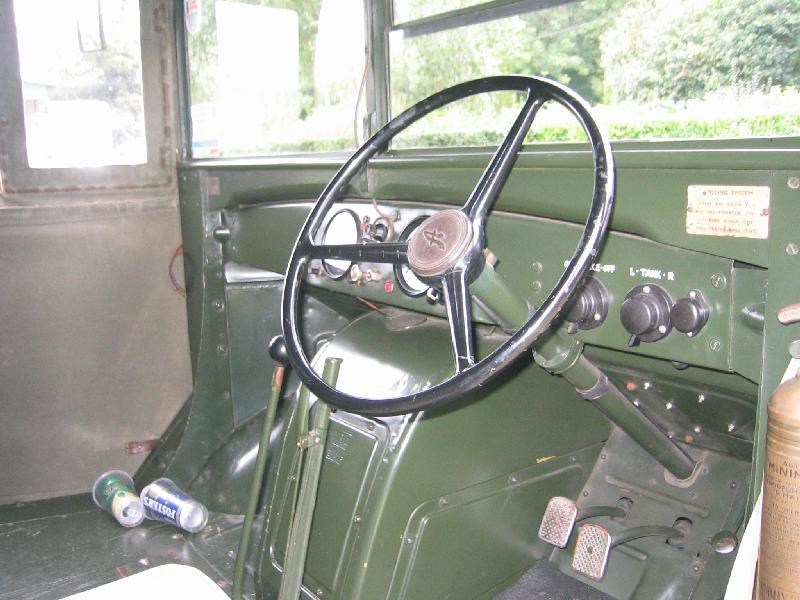
Cab of an Austin K2/Y Ambulance.

=== In action ===
The photographs below show that the Austin K2/Y ambulance was used in many parts of the world during whole WW II and beyond.

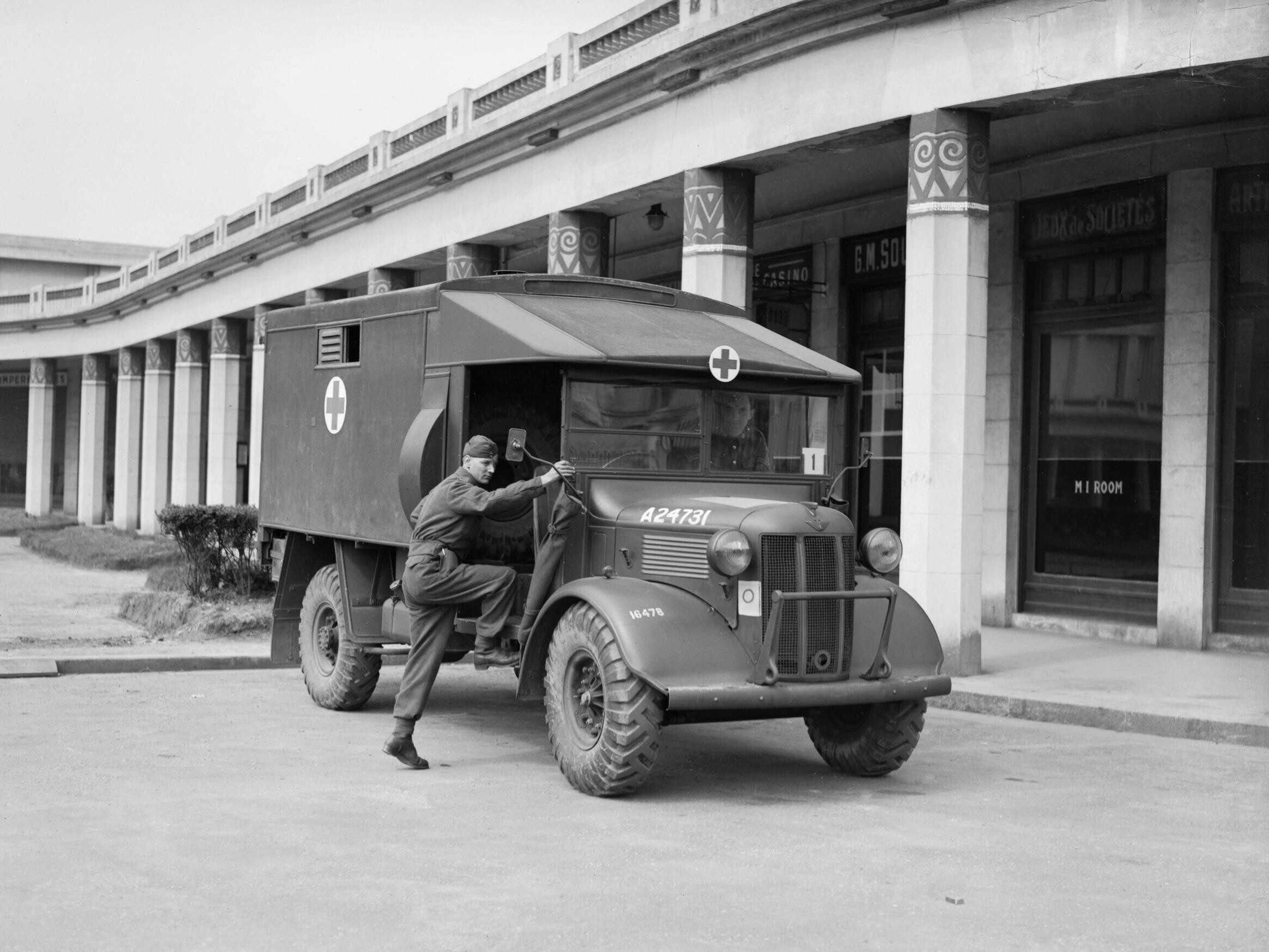
An Austin K2/Y ambulance in France, 9 May 1940.

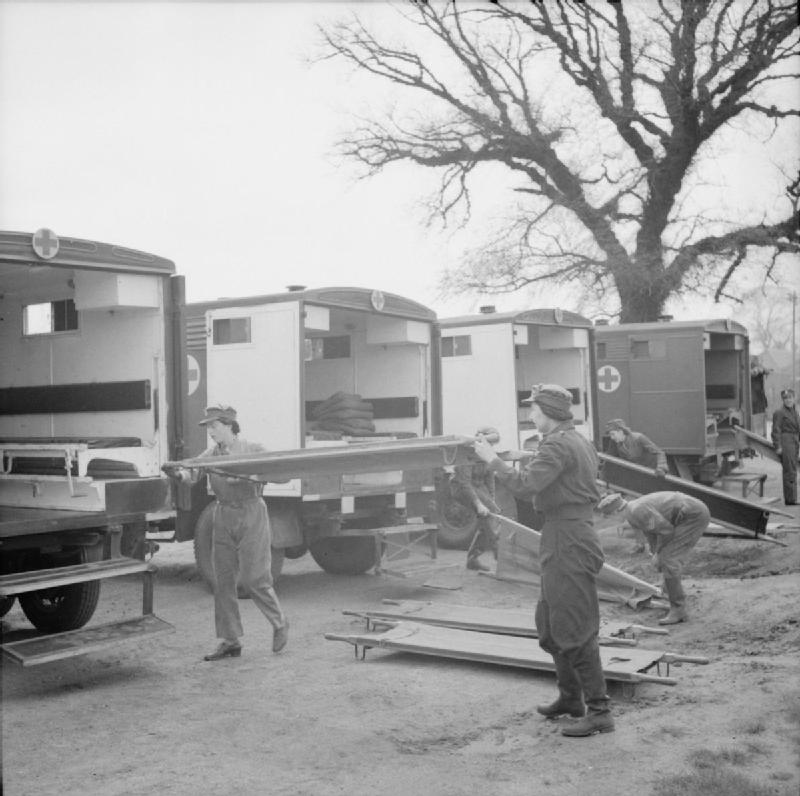
Ambulance crews of the First Aid Nursing Yeomanry (FANYs) stowing stretchers aboard their Austin K2/Y ambulances, Colchester, 3 May 1941.

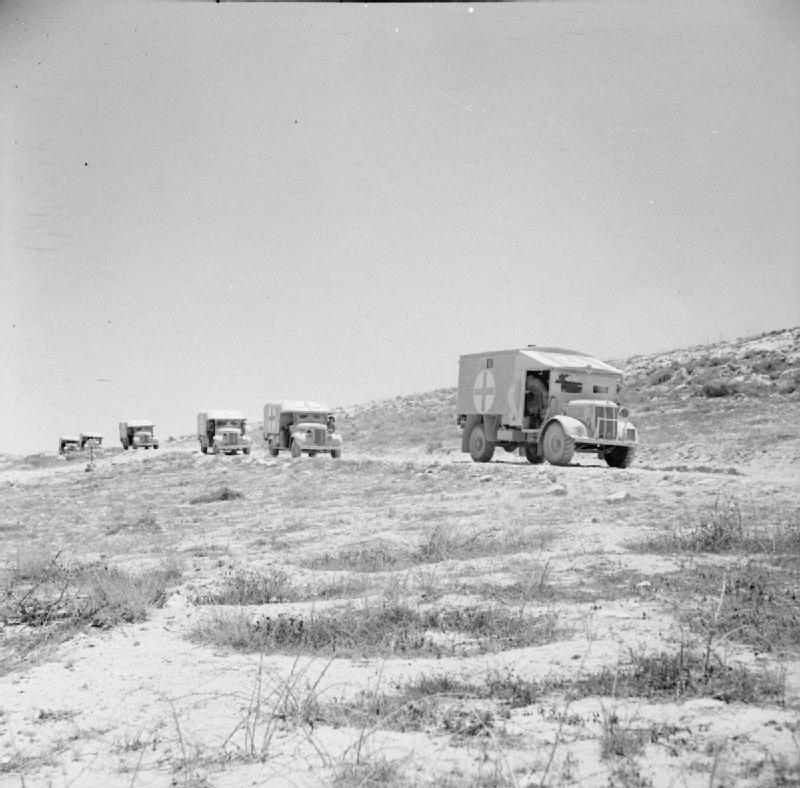
An Austin K2/Y ambulance convoy from the Royal Army Medical Corps moving forwards in the Western Desert, 1940 – 1943.

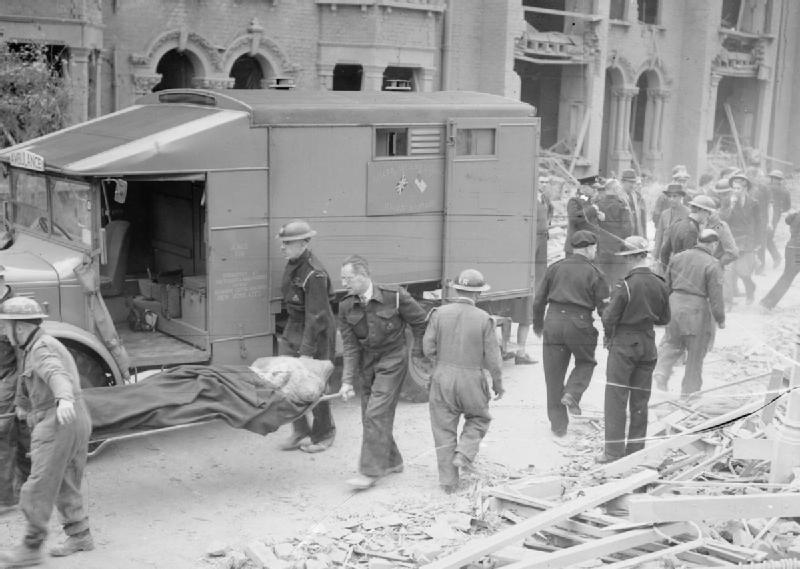
A casualty is carried by Civil Defence stretcher-bearers past an Austin K2/Y of the American Ambulance Great Britain following a V-1 flying bomb attack in London, 1944.

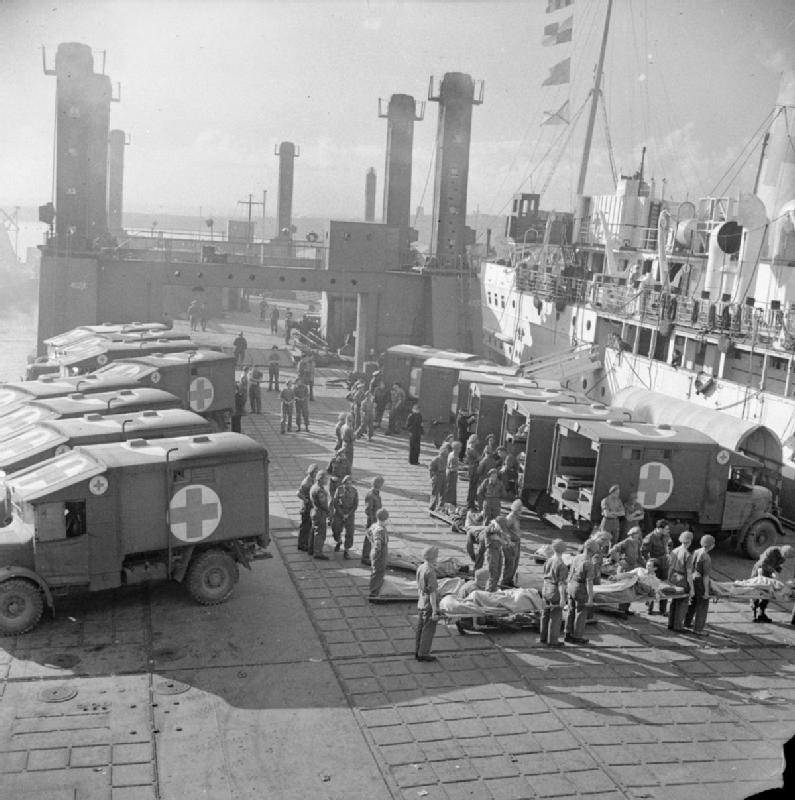
Wounded being transferred from Austin K2/Y ambulances to a hospital ship at the Mulberry artificial harbour, September 1944.

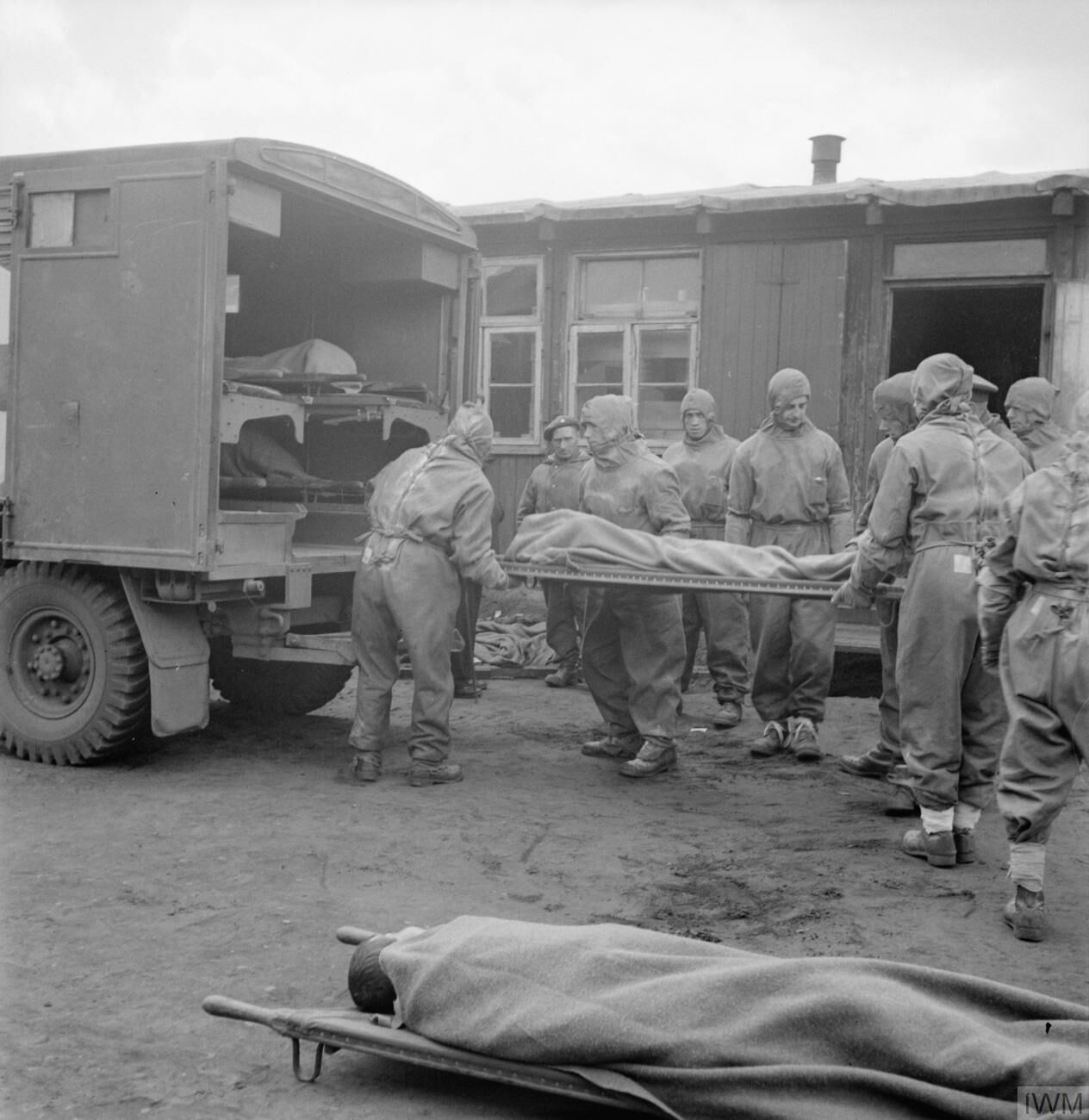
Royal Army Medical Corps, wearing protective clothing, evacuating an inmate suffering from typhus from Bergen-Belsen concentration camp No 1. By 2 May 1945, 6,500 of the sick had been evacuated to hospital.

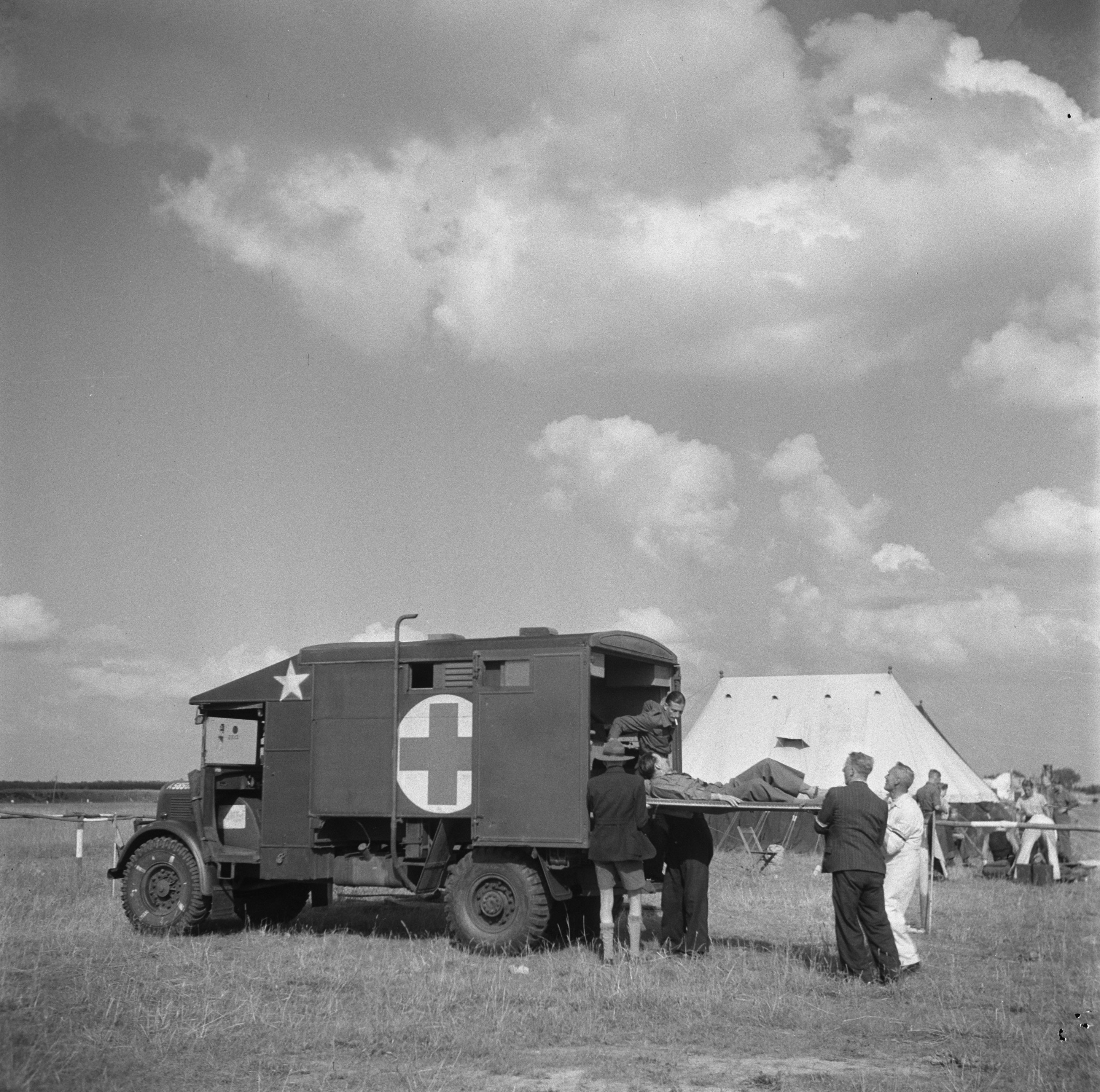
An injured or sick person on a stretcher is loaded into an Austin K2/Y ambulance at a repatriation center in Eindhoven, the Netherlands, 1945.

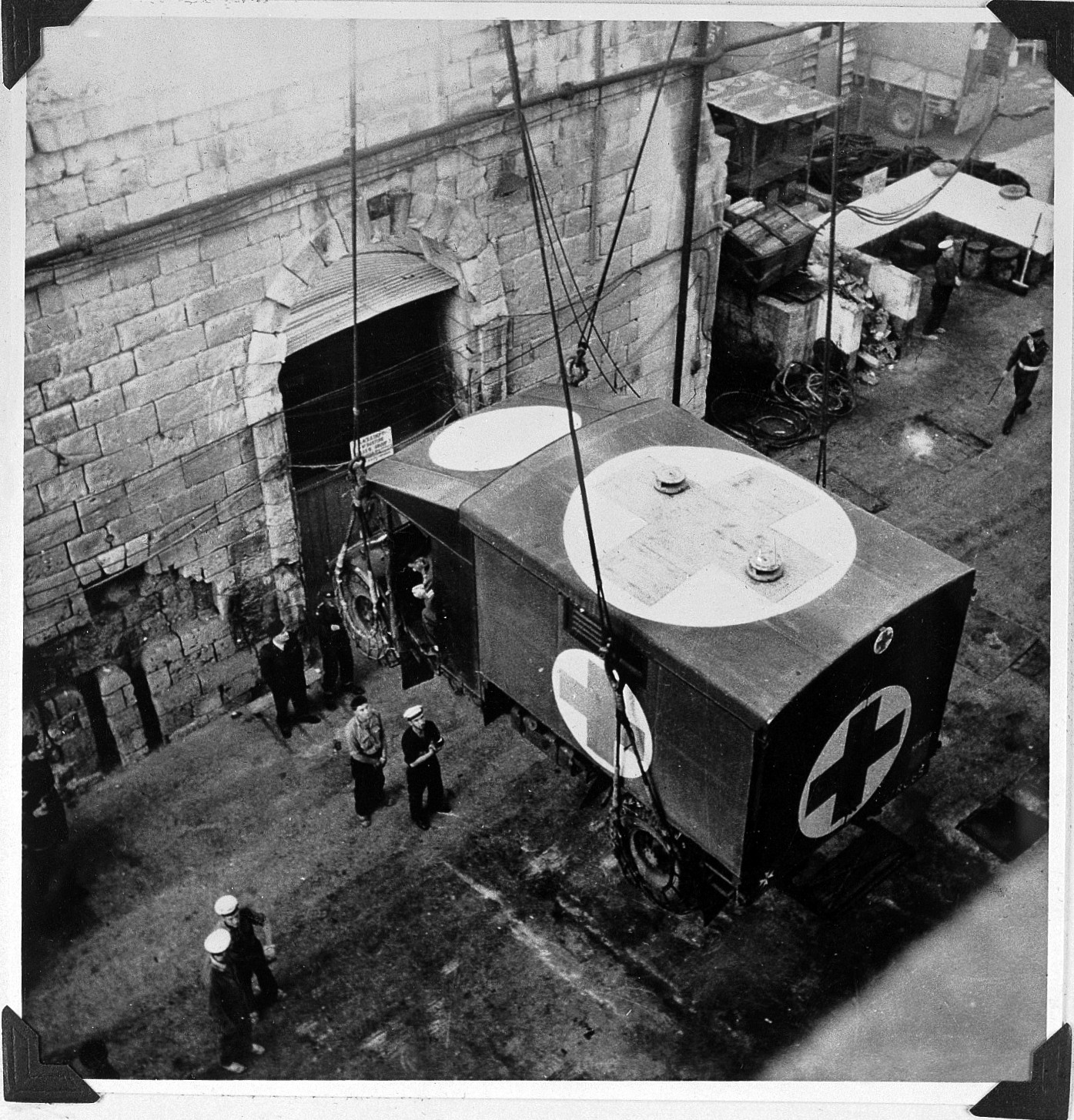
Operation Musketeer, 1956, the invasion of Egypt. An Austin K2/Y ambulance (early version) being lowered from flight deck to dockside.

== See also ==
- History of the ambulance
- Dodge WC54
