= Christopher Landon =

Christopher Landon may refer to:

- Christopher Landon (screenwriter) (1911–1961), British novelist and screenwriter
- Christopher Landon (filmmaker) (born 1975), American film director, producer, and screenwriter
