= History of the ambulance =

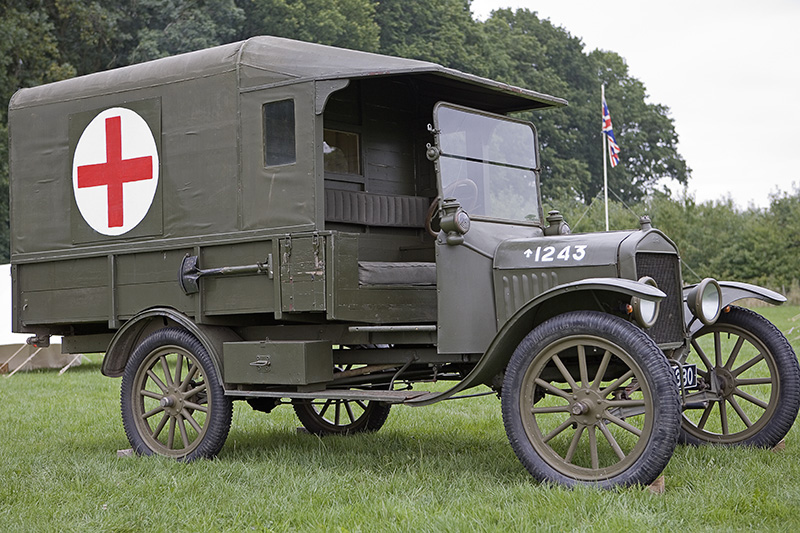
Ford 1916 Model T Field Ambulance. This canvas on wood frame model was used extensively by the British & French as well as the American Expeditionary Force in World War I. Its top speed was 45 mph (72 km/h), produced by a 4-cylinder water-cooled engine.

The history of the ambulance begins in ancient times, with the use of carts to transport patients. Ambulances were first used for emergency transport in 1487 by the Spanish forces during the siege of Málaga by the Catholic monarchs against the Emirate of Granada, and civilian variants were put into operation in the 1830s. Advances in technology throughout the 19th and 20th centuries led to the modern self-powered ambulance.

== Early patient transport ==
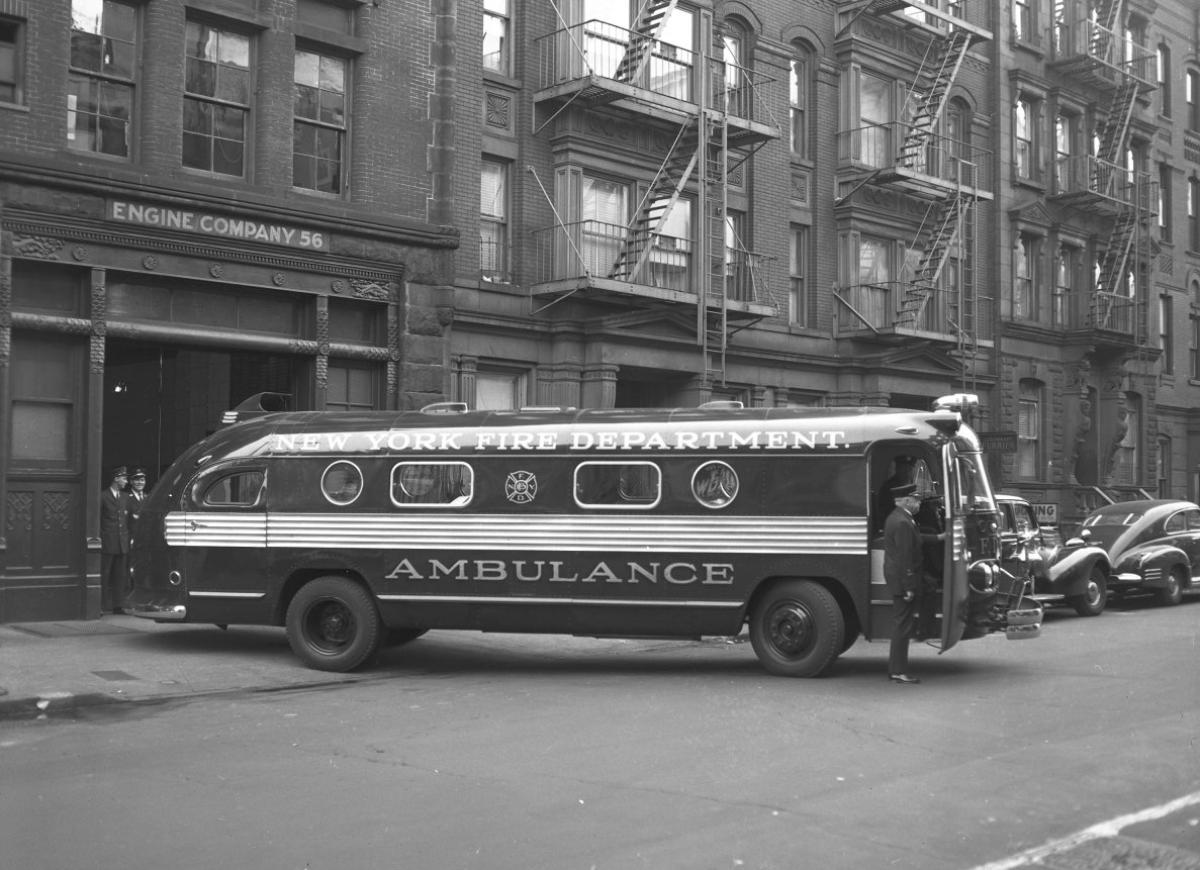
An FDNY ambulance in 1949

There is evidence of forced transport of those with psychiatric problems or leprosy in ancient times. The earliest record of such an ambulance was probably a hammock-based cart constructed around 900 AD by the Anglo-Saxons.

During the Crusades of the 11th century, the Knights Hospitaller set up hospitals to treat pilgrims wounded in their battles in the Holy Land, although there is no clear evidence to suggest how the wounded made their way to these hospitals.

The Normans used a litter suspended between horses on two poles. Variations on the horse litter and horse-drawn wagons were used until the 20th century.

== Early battlefield treatment ==
The first record of ambulances being used for emergency purposes relates to the troops of Isabella I of Castile in 1487. The Spanish army of the time was well treated and attracted volunteers from across the continent; and among their benefits were the first military hospitals (ambulancias), although injured soldiers were not picked up for treatment until after the cessation of the battle, resulting in many dying on the field.

A major change in usage of ambulances in battle came about with the ambulances volantes designed by Dominique Jean Larrey (1766–1842), who later became Napoleon Bonaparte’s chief physician. Larrey was present at the battle of Spires, between the French and Prussians, and was distressed that wounded soldiers were not picked up by the numerous ambulances (which regulations required to be stationed two and a half miles back from the scene of battle) until after hostilities had ceased, so he set about developing a new ambulance system. Having decided against using the Norman system of horse litters, he settled on two- or four-wheeled horse-drawn wagons to transport fallen soldiers from the (active) battlefield after they had received early treatment in the field. Larrey adapted the axle assembly from the French army's horse-drawn artillery ("flying artillery" – artillerie volante) that made their gun carriages especially maneuverable on uneven terrain, and so christened his ambulances "flying ambulances" (ambulances volantes). The flying ambulances were first used by the Army of the Rhine in 1793. Larrey subsequently developed similar services for Napoleon's armies, and adapted his ambulances to the conditions; including developing a litter which could be carried by a camel for the 1798–1801 French campaign in Egypt.

== Development of civilian services ==
In civilian ambulances, a major advance was made with the introduction of a transport carriage for cholera patients in London in 1832. The Times newspaper said, "The curative process commences the instant the patient is put in to the carriage; time is saved which can be given to the care of the patient; the patient may be driven to the hospital so speedily that the hospitals may be less numerous and located at greater distances from each other".

== Advances during the American Civil War ==
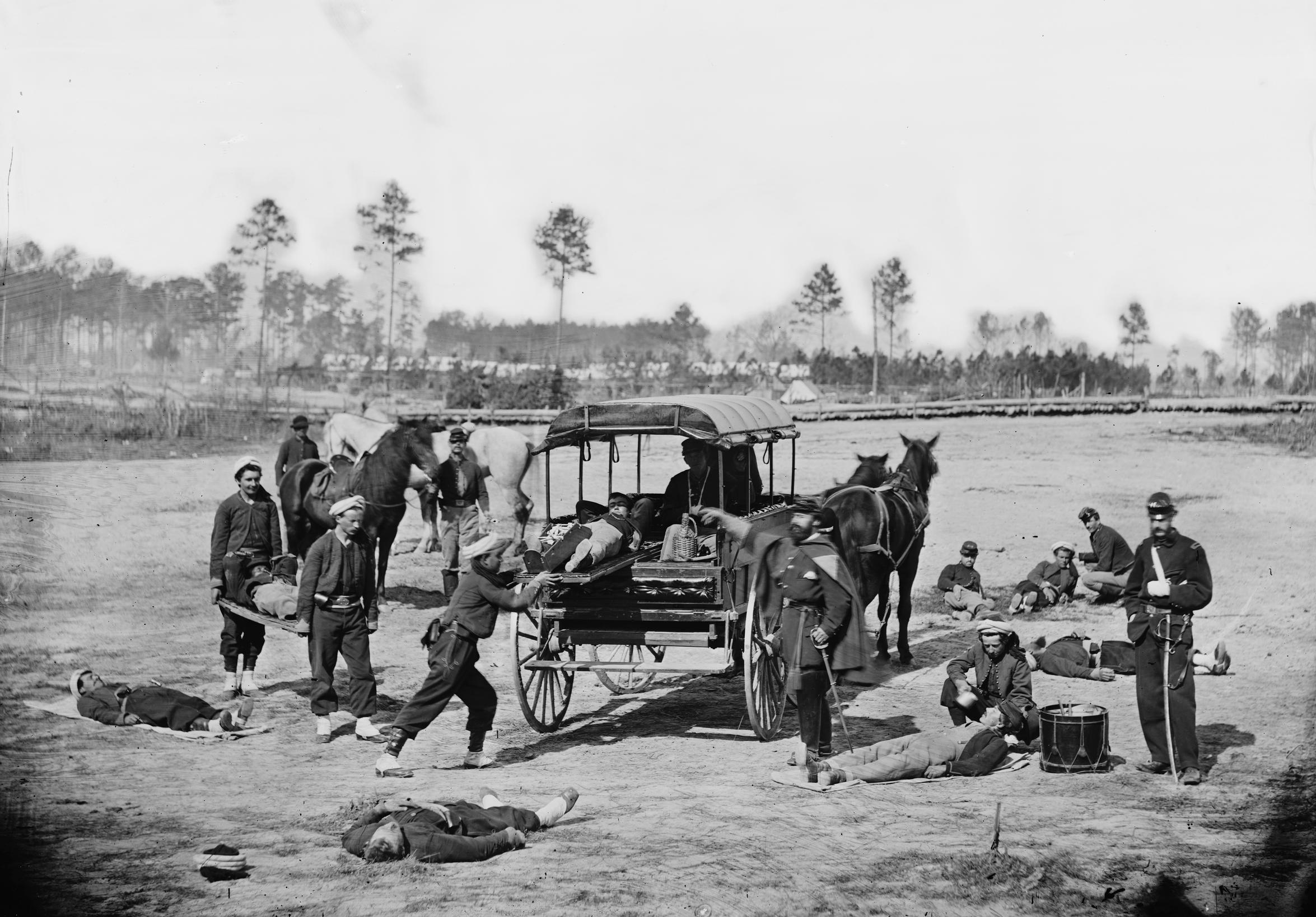
A horse-drawn ambulance from the American Civil War (1861–1865)

More advances in medical care for the military were made during the United States’ Civil War. Union military physicians Joseph Barnes and Jonathan Letterman built upon Larrey’s work and designed a prehospital care system for soldiers, which used new techniques and methods of transport. They ensured that every regiment possessed at least one ambulance cart, with a two-wheeled design that accommodated two or three patients. These ambulances proved to be too lightweight for the task, and were phased out to be replaced by the "Rucker" ambulance, named for Major General Rucker, which was a four-wheeled design, and was a common sight on the battlefield. Other vehicles were pressed into service during the civil war, including a number of steamboats, which served as mobile hospitals for the troops. It was during this period that the practice of transporting wounded soldiers to treatment facilities by railroad was introduced.

== Hospital-based services begin ==
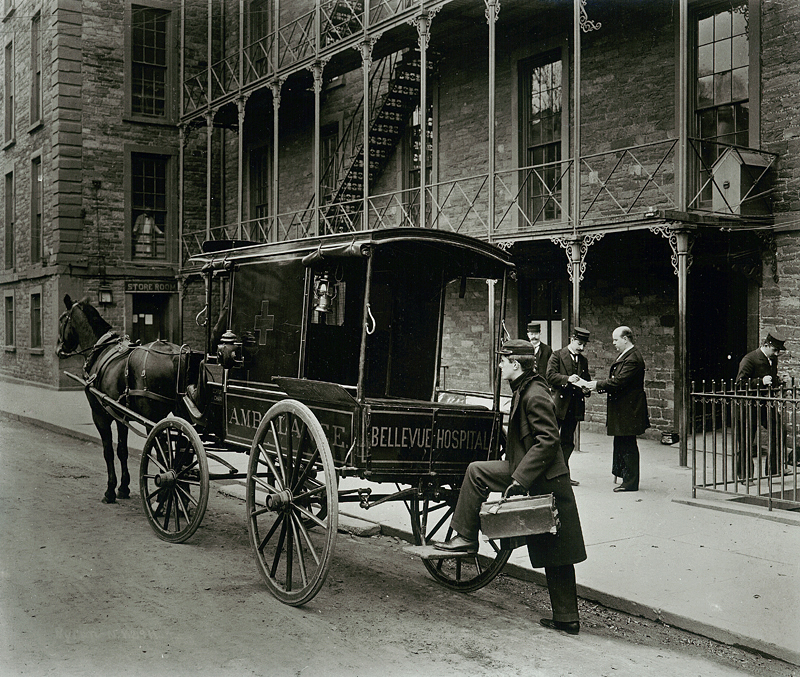
A horse-drawn ambulance outside Bellevue Hospital in New York City, 1895

The first known hospital-based ambulance service was based out of Commercial Hospital, Cincinnati, Ohio, (now the University of Cincinnati Medical Center) by 1865. This was soon followed by other services, notably the New York service provided out of Bellevue Hospital. Edward Dalton, a former surgeon in the Union Army, was charged with creating a hospital in lower New York; he started an ambulance service to bring the patients to the hospital faster and in more comfort, a service which started in 1869. These ambulances carried medical equipment, such as splints, a stomach pump, morphine, and brandy, reflecting contemporary medicine. Dalton believed that speed was of the essence, and at first the horses were kept in harness while awaiting a call: within a few months this practice had been replaced with a 'drop,' or 'snap,' harness arrangement, whereby the tack was lowered by pulley from the ceiling straight onto the horse: under either scheme, ambulances were ready to go within 30 seconds of being called. The service was very popular and grew rapidly, with the year 1870 seeing the ambulances attend 1401 emergency calls, but twenty-one years later, this had more than tripled to 4392. For the first week of their operation, the ambulances were crewed by the hospital's house-staff, after which the hospital hired Drs. Duncan Lee and Robert Taylor as full-time ambulance surgeons; going forward, the plan was to crew the ambulances with fresh graduates of Bellevue's surgical training program, who would serve for six-month terms and be replaced by new hires from successive graduating classes. This scheme foundered immediately, however, when graduates balked at the schedule and the salary offered: $50 a month, twelve-hour shifts, and one day off every four weeks. Instead, by the end of 1869, the system of staffing the ambulance with residents in training (who could simply be assigned, rather than having to be recruited) was firmly established. As late as 1935, these interns were earning the same $50 a month their grandfathers would have received.

In 1867, the city of London's Metropolitan Asylums Board, in the United Kingdom, received six horse-drawn ambulances for the purpose of conveying smallpox and fever patients from their homes to a hospital. These ambulances were designed to resemble private carriages, but were equipped with rollers in their floors and large rear doors to allow for a patient, lying on a specially designed bed, to be easily loaded. Space was provided for an attendant to ride with the patient, and the entire patient compartment was designed to be easily cleaned and decontaminated. Anyone willing to pay the cost of horse hire could summon the ambulance by telegram or in person.

== Dedicated services begin ==
In 1880, the President of the Liverpool Medical Institution, Reginald Harrison, suggested a horse-drawn ambulance for the city. In 1884, this ambulance service was created based at the Liverpool Northern Hospital: it was the first in Britain.

In June 1887 the St John Ambulance Brigade was established to provide first aid and ambulance services at public events in London. It was modelled on a military-style command and discipline structure. The St John Ambulance Association had already been teaching first aid to the public for 10 years prior to that. National or state based branches of St John Ambulance now provides ambulance and first aid services in many countries around the world.

On 6 June 1891, the first ambulance station in Poland and the second in Europe was established in Kraków, modeled on similar services in Vienna. Founded by local physicians and fire officials, it initially operated horse-drawn ambulances before later adopting motor vehicles.

In Ireland the St John Ambulance was set up in 1903 in the Guinness Brewery in St. James Gate in Dublin by Doctor, later Sir, John Lumsden for workers. In 1910 the Brigade began its first public duty at the Royal Dublin Society. During the 1916 rising and (after becoming the independent St. John Ambulance Brigade of Ireland) the 'Emergency' (World War II) the brigade acted as an ambulance service and remained so until the set up of Regional Ambulance Services.

In 1938 the Order of Malta Ambulance Corps was set up in Galway. In the years since this voluntary service has gone from strength to strength and is now Ireland's largest voluntary ambulance service and one of Ireland's largest charities.

In Queensland, Australia, military medic Seymour Warrian called a public meeting in Brisbane and established an ambulance service after witnessing an event at the Brisbane showgrounds during Show Week in 1892. A fallen rider, suffering a broken leg was walked off the field by well-meaning but misguided bystanders, worsening his injury. As a result of the meeting, the Queensland Ambulance Transport Brigade was formed on the 12 September. The first ambulance station in Queensland operated out of the Brisbane Newspaper Company and officers on night duty slept on rolls of newspaper on the floor. They had a stretcher, but no vehicle and transported patients on foot, although in time, they gained horse-drawn stretchers and eventually vehicles. A year after the establishment of the Brisbane centre, another was established in Charters Towers in north Queensland, growing to over 90 community controlled ambulance centres. In 1991 the independent QATB centres amalgamated to form the Queensland Ambulance Service which is now the fourth largest ambulance service in the world.

== Mass transit use for emergency medical provision ==
In the late 19th century St Louis, Missouri, United States started using a trolley car on their tram network designed to act as an ambulance, transporting the sick and injured. The design of the tram network in St Louis was such that the ambulance streetcar, introduced in 1894, was able to reach all 16 infirmaries in the city. Introduced in 1913, trolley cars in Bahia, Brazil, included a fumigating compartment and a two-bed nurses work area.

In Germany, in 1902, a civilian ambulance train was introduced (building on the use of trains during military conflict) for use during railway accidents. It housed a mobile operating room and eight stretchers. Railroad employed surgeons lived near the railway station where the ambulance train was stationed, and were summoned to urgently attend in the event of an emergency. This train had priority over the tracks, with all other trains obliged to give way.

== Introduction of motor units ==
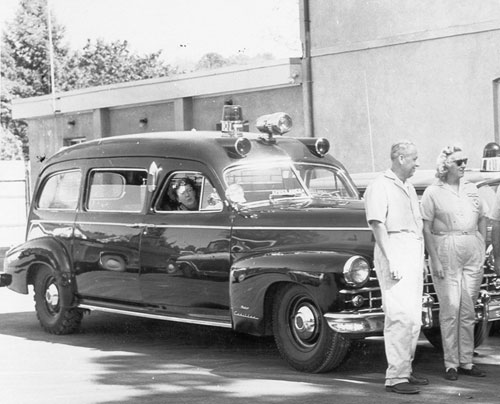
A 1948 Cadillac Meteor ambulance

In the late 19th century, the automobile was being developed, and started to be introduced alongside horse-drawn models; early 20th-century ambulances were powered by steam, gasoline, and electricity, reflecting the competing automotive technologies then in existence. However, the first motor-powered ambulance was brought into service in the last year of the 19th century, with the Michael Reese Hospital, Chicago, taking delivery of the first automobile ambulance, donated in February 1899 by 500 prominent local businessmen. This was followed in 1900, by New York City, which extolled its virtues of greater speed, more safety for the patient, faster stopping and a smoother ride. These first two automobile ambulances were electrically powered with 2 horsepower (1.5 kW) motors on the rear axle.

The first gasoline-powered ambulance was the Palliser Ambulance, introduced in 1905, and named for Capt. John Palliser of the Canadian Militia. This three-wheeled vehicle (one at the front, two at the rear) was designed for use on the battlefield, under enemy fire. It was a heavy tractor unit, cased in bulletproof steel sheets. These steel shields opened outwards to provide a small area of cover from fire (nine feet wide by 7 feet (2.1 m) high) for the ambulance staff when the vehicle was stationary.

On October 6, 1909, Vancouver’s first auto ambulance went for a test drive and promptly killed a pedestrian, a wealthy visitor from Austin, Texas, USA. The ambulance's first job was transporting the man to the hospital, but he had died on the scene. The Vancouver World wrote that “hundreds of men and women saw the dreadful affair, and turned pale and sick as the man was rolled along under the wheels and done to death, the spouting blood adding to the ghastliness of the accident.”

The British Army followed quickly behind the Canadians in introducing a limited number of automobile ambulances. In 1905, the Royal Army Medical Corps commissioned a number of Straker-Squire motor ambulance vans. They were based on a double-decker bus manufactured by the same company, although on a shorter wheelbase. A number of them were based in Oxfordshire, serving several major encampments in the area.

The first mass-production automobile-based ambulance (rather than one-off models) was produced in the United States in 1909 by the James Cunningham, Son & Company of Rochester, New York, a manufacturer of carriages and hearses. This ambulance, named the Model 774 Automobile Ambulance, featured a proprietary 32 horsepower (24 kW), 4-cylinder internal combustion engine. The chassis rode on pneumatic tires, while the body featured electric lights, a suspended cot with two attendant seats, and a side-mounted gong.

== World War I ==
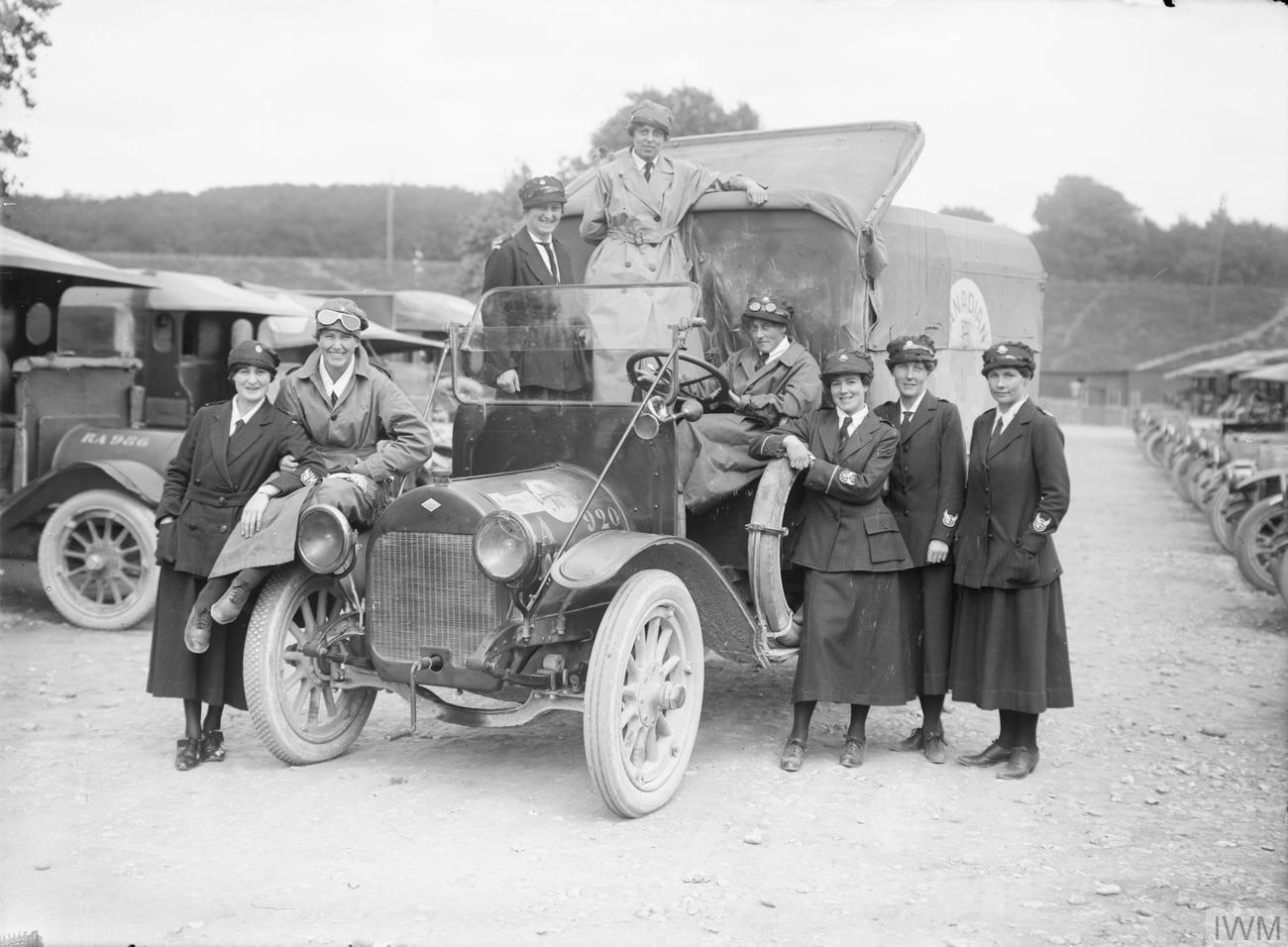
A group of ambulance drivers from the Voluntary Aid Detachment with their vehicle, a Canadian Red Cross ambulance, at Étaples, France (1917)

Throughout World War One, the Red Cross brought in the first widespread battlefield motor ambulances to replace horse-drawn vehicles, a change which was such a success, the horse-drawn variants were quickly phased out. In civilian emergency care, dedicated ambulance services were frequently managed or dispatched by individual hospitals, though in some areas, telegraph and telephone services enabled police departments to handle dispatch duties.

The equipment carried by the ambulance was changing fast at this time. Traction splints were introduced during World War I, and were found to have a positive effect on the morbidity and mortality of patients with leg fractures. Two-way radios became available shortly after World War I, providing more efficient radio dispatch of ambulances. Shortly before World War II, then, a modern ambulance carried advanced medical equipment, was staffed by a physician, and was dispatched by radio. It was frequently found that ambulances were hearses – the only available vehicle that could carry a recumbent patient – and were thus frequently run by funeral homes. These vehicles which could serve for either purpose were known as combination cars.

== Air ambulances ==
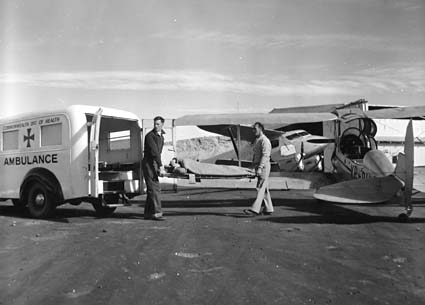
Royal Flying Doctor Service vehicles in 1954

During World War I, aviation moved from experimentation to a powerful military force, and following the war, with a surplus of aircraft in circulation, new uses were found for the aircraft. This included the conversion of planes throughout the world into ambulance planes. Although in 1917, Lieutenant Clifford Peel, a medical student, outlined a system of fixed-wing aircraft and ground facilities designed to provide medical services to the Australian Outback; the first custom-built air ambulances did not come into existence until the late 1920s. These ideas became reality under the guidance of the Very Reverend John Flynn in 1928 when the Australian Inland Mission service established the Aerial Medical Service, a one-year experimental program. Physicians in this program had several responsibilities, one of which was to fly out to a patient, treat the patient, and fly the patient to a hospital if the physician could not deliver adequate care on scene. Eventually, this experiment became the Royal Flying Doctor Service.

== World War II ==
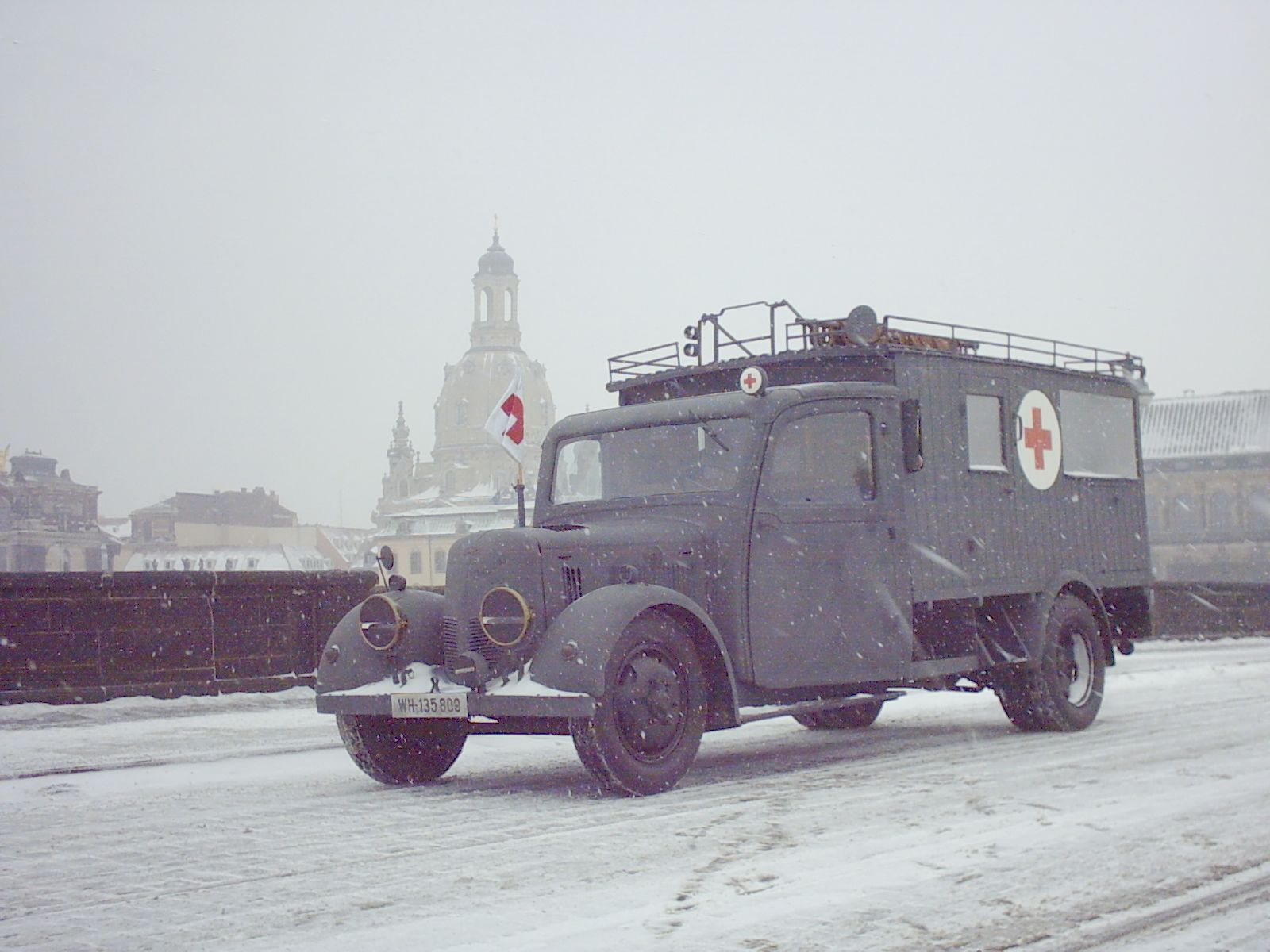
A German ambulance of the World War II era

In much of the world, ambulance quality fell sharply during the Second World War, as physicians, needed by the armed services, were pulled off ambulances. In the United Kingdom, during the Battle of Britain, the need for ambulances was so great that vans were commandeered and pressed into service, often carrying several victims at once. Following the war, physicians would continue to ride ambulances in some countries, but not in others. Other vehicles, including civilian and police cars were pressed into service to transport patients due to a lack of a dedicated resource. Military ambulances such as the Austin K2/Y were used both in the combat areas and on the Home Front. The American Dodge 3/4-ton WC-54 became the standard allied ambulance in front-line units. The Dodge 1/2 ton 9 18 27 became standard around bases overseas and in the States. They also saw combat in Africa and through parts of Europe and the Pacific.

== The Korean War ==
During the Korean War, the newly created United States Air Force produced a number of air-ambulance units for use in forward operating medical units, using helicopters for rapid evacuation of patients. The H-13 Sioux helicopter, made famous by the film and television versions of M*A*S*H, transported 18,000 wounded soldiers during the conflict. The work of the Medical Air Evacuation Squadrons was a success and was repeated by U.S. forces in Vietnam. The use of helicopters for emergency medical evacuations extended to civilian practice by groups such as the Shock Trauma Air Rescue Society.

== Move to on-scene care ==
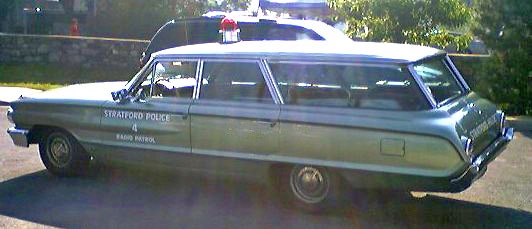
A 1964 police cruiser, which is also fitted to transport patients

After the Harrow and Wealdstone rail crash in 1952, ambulances in Britain were restructured to be a "mobile hospital", rather than just transporting patients, thus leading to modern ambulances. CPR was developed and accepted as the standard of care for out-of-hospital cardiac arrest; defibrillation, based in part on an increased understanding of heart arrhythmias, was introduced, as were new pharmaceuticals to be used in cardiac arrest situations; in Belfast, Northern Ireland, a mobile coronary care ambulance successfully resuscitated patients using these technologies; and well-developed studies demonstrated the need for overhauling ambulance services. These studies placed pressure on governments to improve emergency care in general, including the care provided by ambulance services. Part of the result was the creation of standards in ambulance construction concerning the internal height of the patient care area (to allow for an attendant to continue to care for the patient during transport), and in the equipment (and thus weight) that an ambulance had to carry.

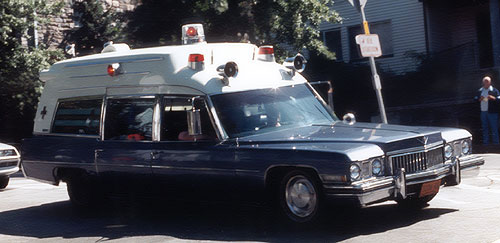
A 1973 Cadillac Miller-Meteor ambulance. Note the higher roof, with more room for the attendants and patient, and the increased number of warning lights.

Few, or perhaps none of the then-available ambulances could meet these standards. Ambulance design therefore underwent major changes in the 1970s. High-topped car-based ambulances were developed, but car chassis proved unable to accept the weight and other demands of the new standards; van (and later, light truck) chassis would have to be used instead. The early van-based ambulances looked very similar to their civilian counterparts, having been given a limited amount of emergency vehicle equipment such as audible and visual warnings, and the internal fittings for carrying medical equipment, most notably a stretcher. Freedom House Ambulance Service was the first emergency medical service in the United States to be staffed by paramedics with medical training beyond basic first aid in 1967. As time went on, ambulances matured in parallel to the newly developed EMS, gaining the capacity to carry additional equipment (both portable and permanently installed) as EMTs and paramedics added this equipment to their arsenal. Ambulance design also evolved to reflect the ergonomics and other human factors of emergency medical care (for instance, raising the roof higher than typical for a van). Advances in the technology and understanding of emergency vehicle equipment also continued to influence ambulance design, just as it did for police and fire-suppression vehicles.

== Modern vehicles ==
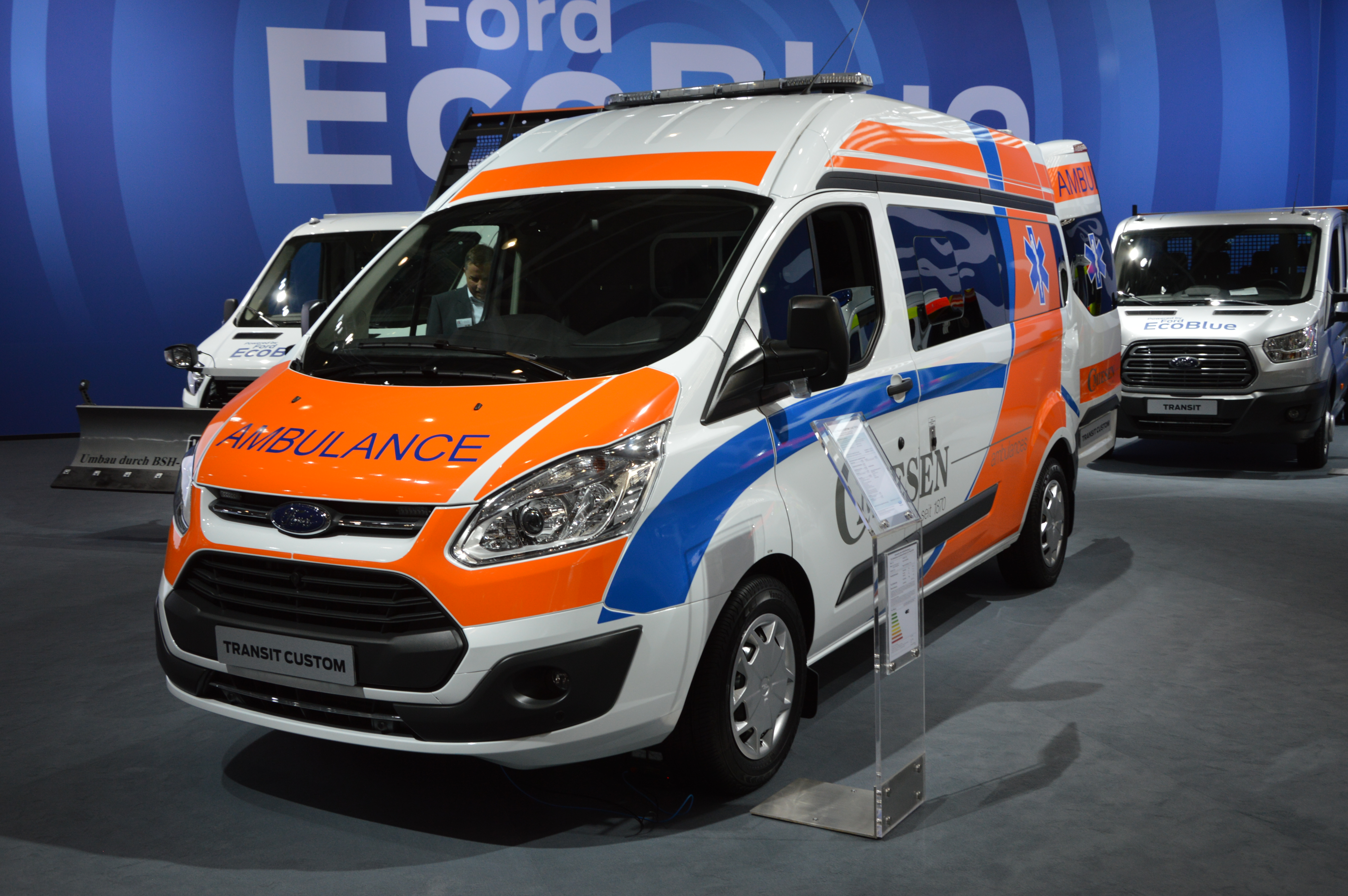
Ford Transit Custom ambulance in 2016 Germany

Modern ambulances are now often custom-built, and as well as the specialist medical equipment now built into the ambulances, industry-wide improvements in vehicle design have had an impact, including improvements in audible and visual warning equipment to help protect crews in vulnerable situations (such as at a road traffic collision), and general improvements such as ABS, which are particularly valuable for ambulances, due to the speeds reached and the weight carried. There have also been improvements to help safeguard the health and welfare of ambulance crews, such as the addition of patient tail lifts, ramps and winches, to cut down on the amount of manual handling a crew must perform.

Ambulance design is still evolving, largely due to the growing skills and role of paramedics and other ambulance crew, which require specialist equipment. Other factors driving improvement include the need to help protect ambulance crews from common accidents, such as traffic collisions and rarer, but potentially catastrophic incidents such as terrorist activities.

== See also ==
- Dodge WC54
- Combat medic
