= Ice Cold in Alex =

1958 British war film directed by J. Lee Thompson

- British film poster
- Directed by: J. Lee Thompson
- Screenplay by: Christopher Landon; T. J. Morrison
- Based on: Ice Cold in Alex (1957 novel) by Christopher Landon
- Produced by: W. A. Whittaker
- Starring: John Mills; Sylvia Syms; Anthony Quayle; Harry Andrews
- Cinematography: Gilbert Taylor
- Edited by: Richard Best
- Music by: Leighton Lucas
- Production company: Associated British Picture Corporation
- Distributed by: Associated British-Pathé (UK)
- Release date: 24 June 1958 (London)
- Running time: 130 minutes
- Country: United Kingdom
- Language: English

Ice Cold in Alex is a 1958 British war film directed by J. Lee Thompson and starring John Mills, Sylvia Syms, Anthony Quayle and Harry Andrews. It is based on the 1957 novel by Christopher Landon, who also co-wrote the screenplay. Set during the Western Desert campaign of World War II, the film follows a small Field Ambulance unit that must cross treacherous territory to reach friendly lines in Alexandria. The title refers to the characters' desire to drink an "ice cold lager in 'Alex'" (Alexandria).

The film was released in the UK by Associated British-Pathé on 24 June 1958. It was a critical and commercial success, becoming one of the highest-grossing films at the British box office for that year. It was nominated in four categories at the 12th British Academy Film Awards, including Best Film and Best British Actor (for Quayle). At the 8th Berlin International Film Festival, Ice Cold in Alex was nominated for Golden Bear and won the FIPRESCI Award.

Under the title Desert Attack, a shortened 79-minute version of the film was released in the United States in 1961.

== Plot ==
Captain Anson, the officer commanding a British RASC Motor Ambulance Company in Tobruk, is suffering from battle fatigue and alcoholism. Ahead of the Axis capture of Tobruk by the Afrika Korps, Anson's unit is ordered to evacuate to Alexandria. Anson, RSM Tom Pugh and two nurses, Sister Diana Murdoch and Sister Denise Norton, become separated from the others in an Austin K2/Y ambulance nicknamed Katy. (Note: These vehicles were commonly known as Katys or Katies during their wartime service.) Attempting to reach British lines they encounter an Afrikaner South African officer, Captain van der Poel. Van der Poel tells Anson he has three bottles of gin in his pack, thus persuading Anson to allow him to accompany them to safety in Alexandria.

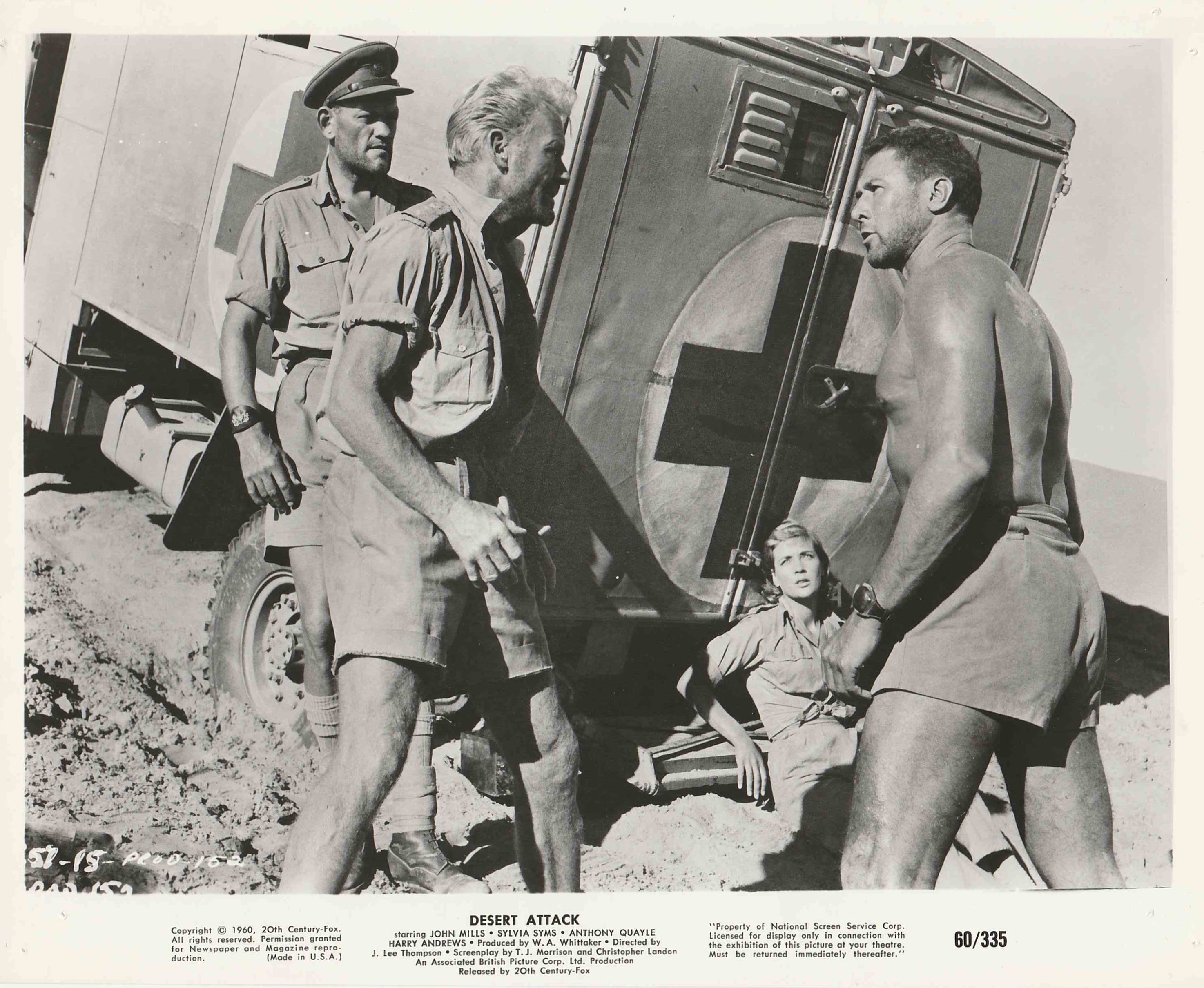
Publicity poster for the North American release of the film. The ambulance, Katy, has become stuck in the sand.

They encounter various obstacles, including a minefield, a broken suspension spring, which van der Poel helps change, and the dangerous terrain of the Qattara Depression. In an encounter with a German motorised unit, Norton is fatally wounded by gunfire. Anson blames himself and vows not to drink any alcohol until he can have an "ice-cold lager in 'Alex'". Van der Poel, who claims to have learned German while working in South West Africa, convinces the Germans to allow them to continue. In a second encounter, the Germans seem reluctant to believe van der Poel until he shows them his pack.

Pugh, troubled by van der Poel's lack of knowledge of the South African Army's tea-brewing technique, spies on him when he walks off alone, supposedly to dig a latrine, and thinks he sees a radio antenna. At night, when they turn on the ambulance headlights to see what van der Poel is doing, he blunders into quicksand in a panic and submerges his pack. Anson and Murdoch confirm that it contains a radio set and drag him to safety. Realising van der Poel is probably a German spy, they choose not to confront him since Katy must be hand-cranked in reverse up a sand dune escarpment and his strength is crucial to their success.

The party concludes they do not want to see van der Poel shot for espionage, and after they reach Alexandria, Anson delivers everyone's papers except van der Poel's to the military police checkpoint. He reports that "van der Poel" is a lost German soldier who surrendered to them under parole. The MPs agree to let the party have a farewell drink with their captive before taking him into custody. They go into a bar where Anson downs a cold beer with relish but a Corps of Military Police officer arrives before they have finished the first round of drinks to arrest van der Poel. Anson, indebted to van der Poel for saving their lives, says that if he gives his real name he will be treated as a prisoner of war rather than executed as a spy. Van der Poel admits to being a German engineer officer, real name Otto Lutz. Pugh rips Lutz's fake South African dog tag off and they say their farewells. Before he leaves Lutz makes a short farewell speech, concluding that he had learned things about the English that were not what he had been taught, and that they have all had "quite an experience. All against the desert, the greater enemy."

== Cast ==
- John Mills as Captain Anson
- Sylvia Syms as Sister Diana Murdoch
- Anthony Quayle as Captain van der Poel/Hauptmann Otto Lutz
- Harry Andrews as MSM Tom Pugh
- Diane Clare as Sister Denise Norton
- Richard Leech as Captain Crosbie
- Liam Redmond as Brigadier, Deputy Director Medical Services
- Allan Cuthbertson as the Brigadier's Staff Officer
- David Lodge as CMP Captain (tank trap)
- Michael Nightingale as CMP Captain (checkpoint)
- Basil Hoskins as CMP Lieutenant (Alexandria)
- Walter Gotell as 1st German Officer
- Frederick Jaeger as 2nd German Officer
- Richard Marner as German Guard
- Peter Arne as British Long Range Desert Group officer at oasis
- Paul Stassino as the barman

== Production ==
=== Writing and casting ===
The film was based on the 1957 novel Ice Cold in Alex and its serialisation (as Escape in the Desert) in the magazine Saturday Evening Post. The New York Times described the book as "an excellent escape story played out in the best Hitchcock manner."

The screenplay contains multiple key changes from the novel, including making Anson rather than Pugh the protagonist. ABPC bought the rights and assigned T. J. Morison to collaborate on a treatment with Landon under the supervision of Walter Mycroft.

Richard Todd says he turned down a lead role because he felt the story was far fetched and he was getting tired of military roles.

=== Filming ===
Filming began 10 September 1957 in Tripoli, Libya. The producers had intended to shoot the location work for Ice Cold in Alex in Egypt, but they had to switch to Libya because of the Suez conflict. Several British films were being shot in Africa at around this time, including No Time to Die, Nor the Moon by Night and The Black Tent. Interiors were filmed at Elstree Studios.

Sylvia Syms (Sister Murdoch) said in a 2011 interview about the film that conditions during the desert shoot were so difficult it felt like they were actually in the situation the film portrays. She said: "You may find this hard to believe, but there was very little acting. It was horrible. We became those people ... we were those people". She said that today people would probably call it method acting, but added: 'We didn't know what Method Acting was, we just called it 'getting on with it'."

Syms said that during the scene where the ambulance rolls backwards down the hill narrowly avoiding her, the actors assumed there would be a hawser to stop the vehicle if anything went wrong, but there was not. The actress said she was "pretty sure" Mills, Quayle, and Andrews angrily upbraided director J. Lee Thompson for this risky approach. She added: "He liked to push actors a bit". The quicksand sequence was filmed in an ice-cold artificial bog in an English studio and was "very tough" on Quayle and Mills. Syms said the producers got a good deal out of her for "£30 a week", adding: "But I made a lot more when they turned it into an advert for Carlsberg". She said there are "no false heroics in it" and that she had been told by desert war veterans it is a good picture of soldiers in that theatre of war, adding: "I am proud of it".

=== Music ===
The film score was composed by Leighton Lucas. He wrote a stirring military march called "The Road to Alex", which was the main theme, and a "Romance".

== Release ==
The film premiered in London on June 24, 1958, and opened to general release on October 6.

Under the title Desert Attack, a shortened 79-minute version of the film was released in the United States by 20th Century Fox in 1961. Film critic Craig Butler later referred to the shortened version as nonsensical.

=== Home media ===
A Region B/2 Blu-ray restoration of Ice Cold in Alex was released in the United Kingdom on 18 February 2018. A restored region B/2 version was previously released on 11 September 2011. In March 2020, the film was released on Blu-ray in region A/1 (North America) by Film Movement Classics in a five-film set called Their Finest Hour 5 British War Classics.

== Reception ==
=== Box office ===
The film was one of the twelve most popular at the British box office in 1958 (that list included several other war-related movies – The Bridge on the River Kwai, The Camp on Blood Island, Dunkirk, The Key, Carve Her Name with Pride, The Wind Cannot Read – as well as Carry On Sergeant, A Cry from the Streets, Happy Is the Bride and Indiscreet.) Kinematograph Weekly listed it as being "in the money" at the British box office in 1958 and was "a huge success".

=== Awards and nominations ===
Event	Category	Nominee	Result	Ref.
8th Berlin International Film Festival	Golden Bear	J. Lee Thompson	Nominated	
8th Berlin International Film Festival	FIPRESCI Award	J. Lee Thompson	Won	
12th British Academy Film Awards	Best Film	—N/a	Nominated	
12th British Academy Film Awards	Best British Film	—N/a	Nominated	
12th British Academy Film Awards	Best British Screenplay	T. J. Morrison	Nominated	
12th British Academy Film Awards	Best British Actor	Anthony Quayle	Nominated	

== Lager advertisement ==
The final scene, in which Mills's character finally gets his glass of lager, was used in the 1980s in beer advertisements on television. The scene was reportedly filmed some weeks after the rest of the film, at Elstree. Real lager had to be used to "look right", and Mills had to drink numerous glasses full until the shots were finished, and was "a little 'heady'" by the end.

Sylvia Syms has said that the Danish beer Carlsberg was chosen because they could never have been seen to be drinking a German lager, since the United Kingdom and Germany were at war during the film. The beer referred to in the original novel is Rheingold, which, despite its German name, is American.

Scenes from the film were used in a late-1980s television advertising campaign for the German Holsten Pils lager. Each advertisement mixed original footage from a different film (another example was The Great Escape, 1963) with new humorous material starring British comedian Griff Rhys Jones and finishing with the slogan: "A Holsten Pils Production". In retaliation, rival Carlsberg simply lifted the segment in which Mills contemplates the freshly poured lager in the clearly Carlsberg-branded glass, before downing it in one go and declaring, "Worth waiting for!" This was followed by a variation in the usual Carlsberg tagline: "Still probably the best lager in the world."
