= Dodge WC54 =

US military ambulance

Dodge WC-54 / WC-64
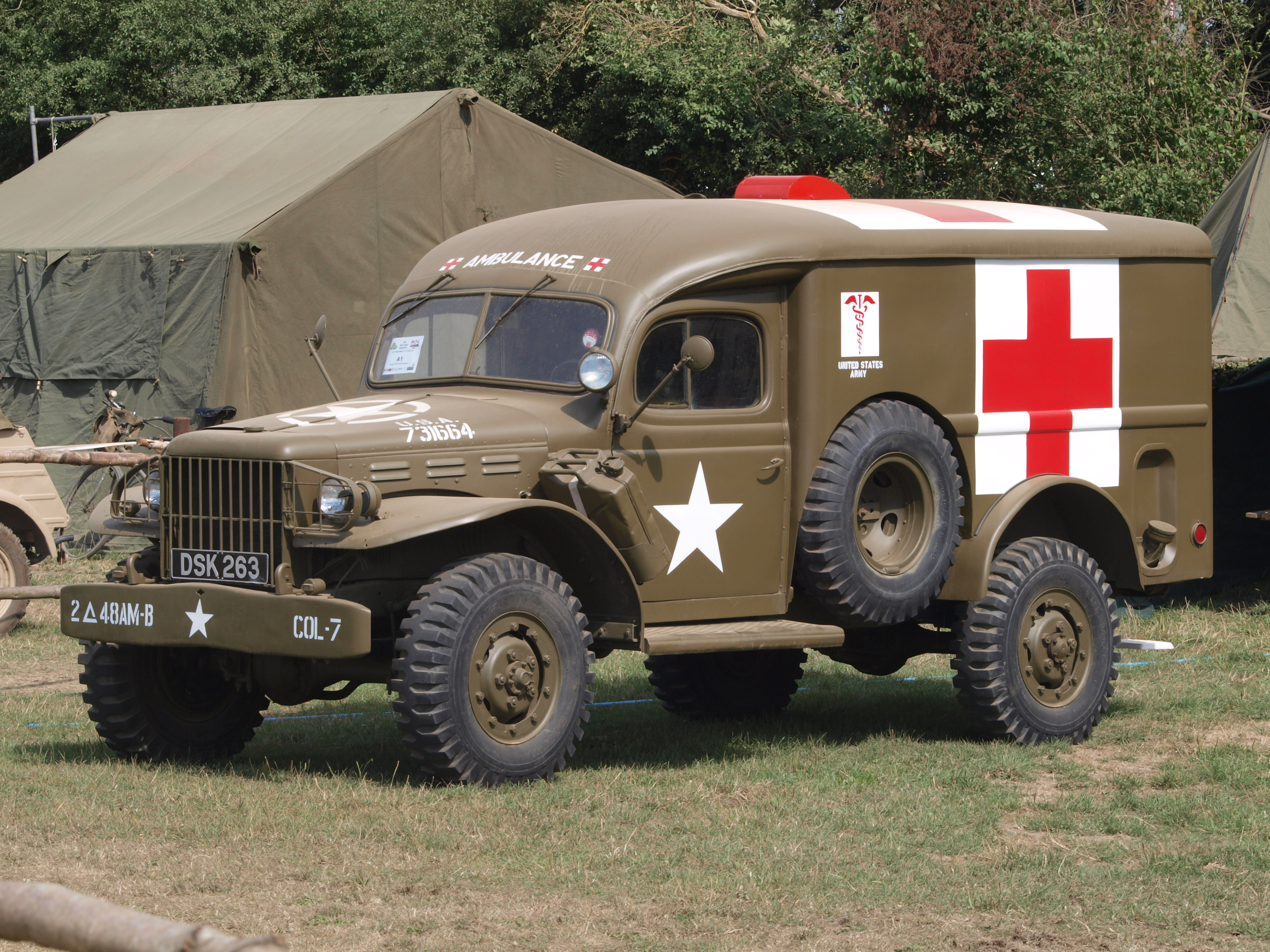
- Dodge WC-54 (1943)

Overview
- Manufacturer: Fargo (Dodge)
- Production: 1942–1944 (WC-54); 26,002 built 1945 (WC-64 KD); 3,500 built

Body and chassis
- Class: Light truck

Powertrain
- Engine: 230 cu in (3.8 L) I6
- Transmission: 4-speed manual

Dimensions
- Wheelbase: 121 in (3.07 m)
- Length: 194 1/2 in (4.94 m)
- Width: 77 3/4 in (1.97 m)
- Height: 90 3/8 in (2.30 m)
- Curb weight: 2,680 kilograms (5,910 lb)

Chronology
- Predecessor: Dodge G-505 1/2-Ton, 4×4 ambulances
- Successor: Dodge M43; M37 3/4-ton truck series

The Dodge WC-54, Ambulance, 3/4-ton, 4 x 4 (SNL supply catalog designation G-502), was the main military ambulance variant of the prolific Dodge WC series of light 4×4 trucks, developed during World War II. Built from 1942 until 1945, they served as the U.S. Army's main dedicated ambulance (besides the many multi-purpose jeeps serving as such), with many also serving in the Korean War, in the U.S. Army Medical Corps, some used as late as 1953; and others serving as late as the 1960s in the armies of some European countries.

== Design and production ==
The 3/4‑ton WC-54 was designed as successor to the previous 1/2-ton, 4×4, G-505 models WC-9, WC-18, and WC-27 Dodge Ambulance trucks. Although based on the 3/4-ton Dodge "Beep" chassis, which front and rear axles featured wider tracks of 64 3/4 in (1.64 m), the 3/4-ton ambulance versions retained a longer wheelbase, very close to that of the previous half-tonners, as well as somewhat rounded, upward sloping nose sheetmetal, instead of the fully horizontal, flat and wider engine-cover of the main 3/4‑ton redesigned WC-models. The WC-54s also had adjusted suspension to make their ride softer.

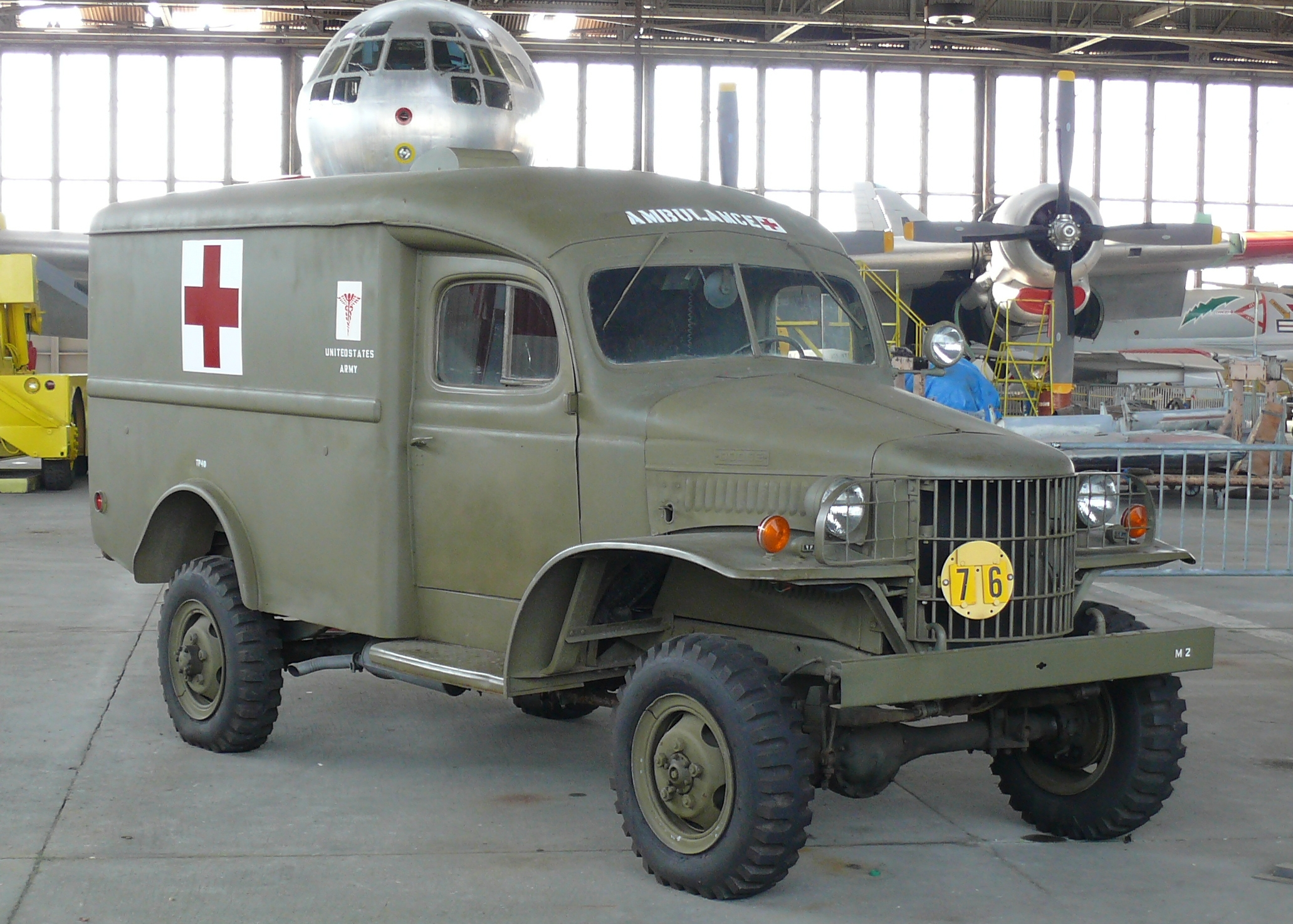
The body of the 1/2-ton WC-27 (pictured) was largely carried over on the 3/4-ton WC‑54.

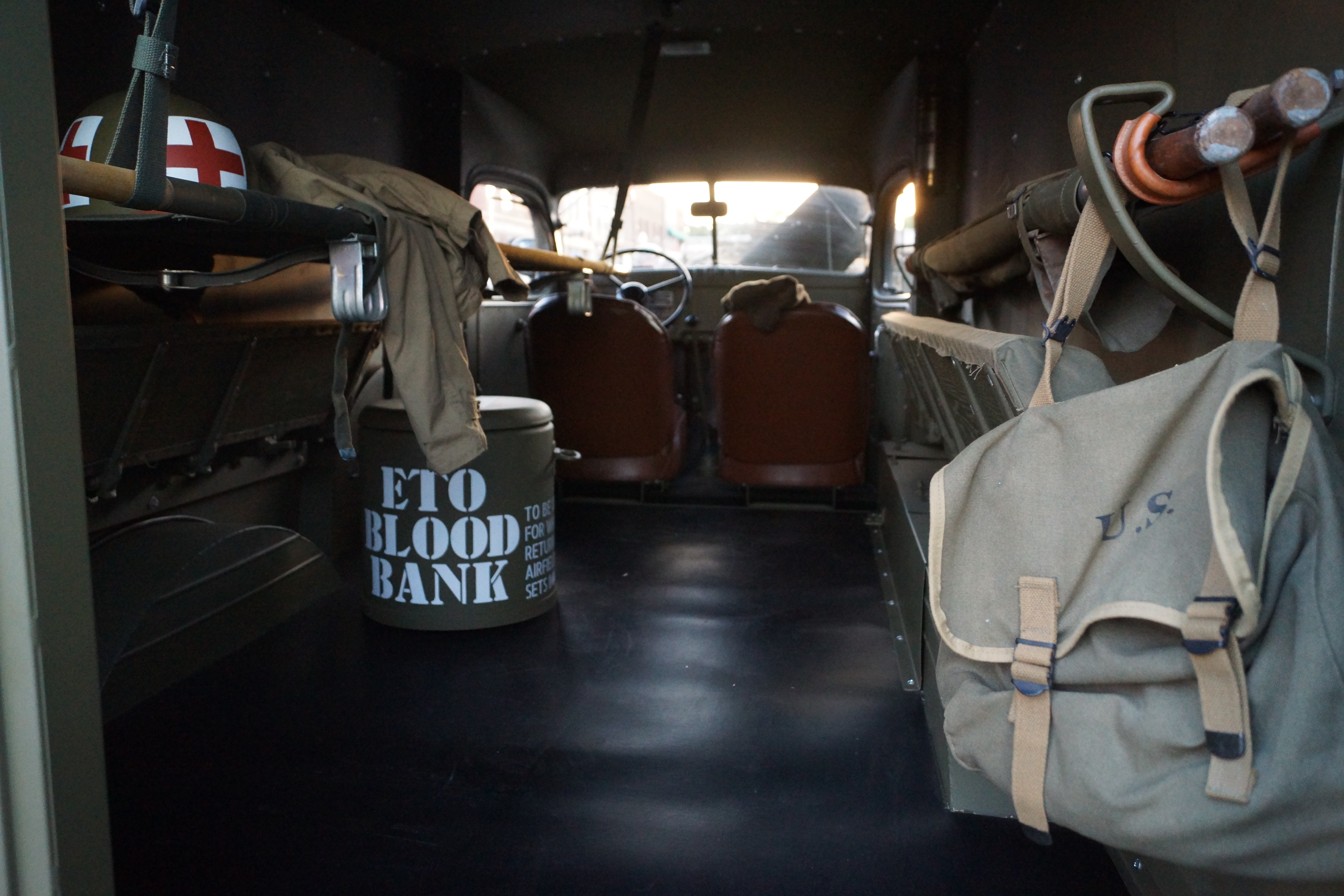
WC-54 interior.

The closed sheet-metal body was made by Wayne Body works. It had room for a driver and four to seven patients plus a medic. If the fold-away bunk stretchers were used, four patients could be transported lying down. Because of its intended role, the WC-54 featured a large matrix cab heater fitted on the inner firewall, providing comfort for patients and crew. It was fitted with a foldaway step to its rear to allow easier access for stretcher bearers and injured personnel. Early models featured a stuck out fuel filler cap which was changed to a recessed one in the later model, a modification that was retrofitted to some early model trucks.

Drivers preferred WC54 to the Ford ambulance, Austin K2/Y, and other vehicles, because of its unusual 4x4 drive. An American Field Service volunteer reported that WC54 was "not very much more difficult to drive than a pleasure car", and another recalled "the nimble four-wheel drive Dodge ambulances which would become an extension of ourselves in the years ahead". They praised its versatility and reliability. From 1942 to 1945, total production of the 3/4-ton Dodge WC-series was some 255,000. Of these, 29,502 were ambulances — 26,002 WC‑54 and 3,500 WC-64 KD models. The vehicles were supplied under US government contracts W398-QM-11420 (850 units), W398-QM-11422 (9,945 units), DAW398-QM-448 (16 units), W398-QM-13596 (410 units) and W374-ORD-2864 (11,636 units).

=== WC-64 Knock-Down ===
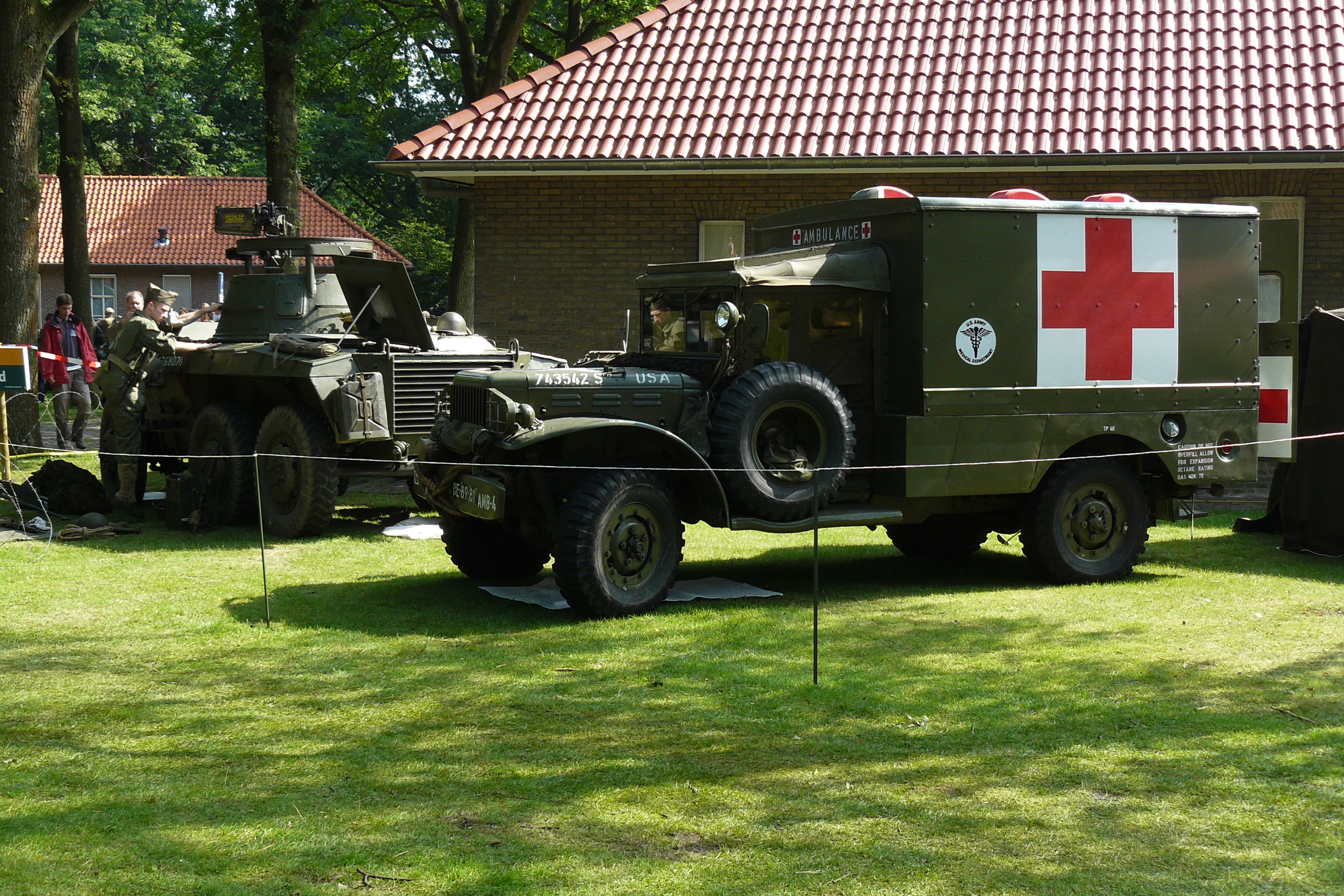
Dodge WC-64 (KD) Ambulance (1945)

Virtually unchanged for three years, apart from minor technical tweaks, in 1945 it was replaced by a new knock-down body design, the WC‑64 (KD). Based on essentially the same chassis as the WC‑54, the rear ambulance boxes were now split in two major sections: lower and upper, designed primarily to increase the number of vehicles that could be shipped at the same time. The lower part of the ambulance body was attached to the chassis at the factory, while the upper box consisted of flat panels, shipped in crates for installation in the field. Only produced in 1945, just 3,500 of these were made before the war ended. Other model changes made the WC‑64 more similar to the WC‑51: the factory-fitted lower ambulance-box outwardly resembles that of the WC‑51's rear bed boxes, though the WC‑64 is of course longer; and the flat instead of sloped hood, and spare wheel placement are now also like on a WC‑51.

The "knocked-down" condition was so much more space-efficient that two ambulances could now be stacked, and shipped in the same space that would previously hold only one conventional WC‑54 ambulance. Additionally, the reduced size also allowed air transportation of the vehicle.

== In popular culture ==
As a result of the WC-54's continued use in the Korean War, they were often visible in the 1972 to 1983 M*A*S*H TV series, a comedy drama set in that war.

== Operators ==
United States

- U.S. Army Medical Corps

United Kingdom

- Royal Army Medical Corps

(Free France) France

- Free French Forces

Brazil

- Brazilian Expeditionary Force

Greece

- Greek Army and Greek Air Force

Austria

- Austrian Army

Belgium

- Belgian Army

Norway

- Norwegian Army

Philippines

- Philippine Army
- Philippine Constabulary
- Philippine Marine Corps

Portugal

- Portuguese Army

Sweden

- Swedish Coastal Artillery

Yugoslavia

- Yugoslav Army

== Images ==
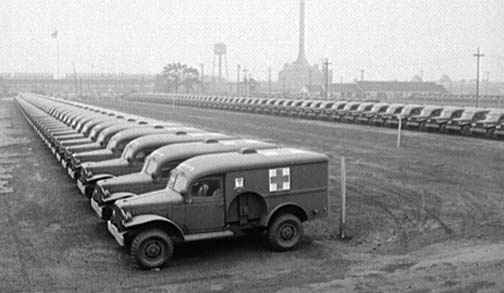
WC-54s lined up for delivery.

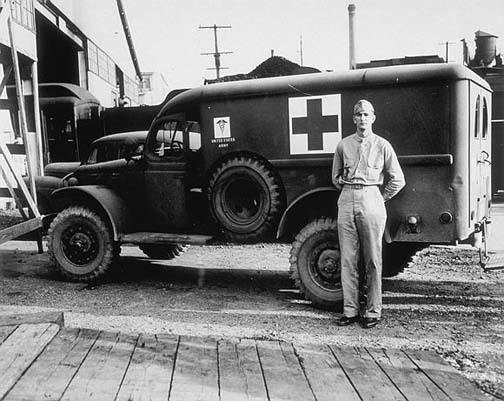
Ambulance at entrance to Pier 5, waiting for debarkation of wounded American soldiers from Tunisia.

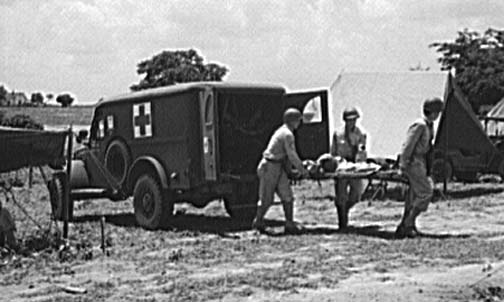
Training for the removal of wounded, Greenville, South Carolina, July 1943.

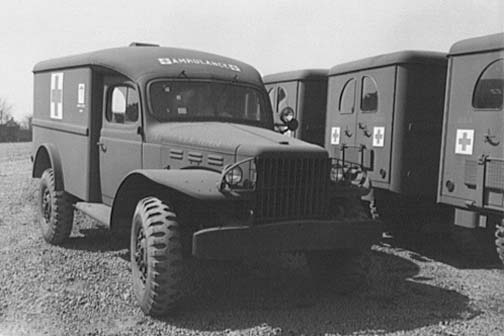
Awaiting shipment from the Dodge factory, April 1943.

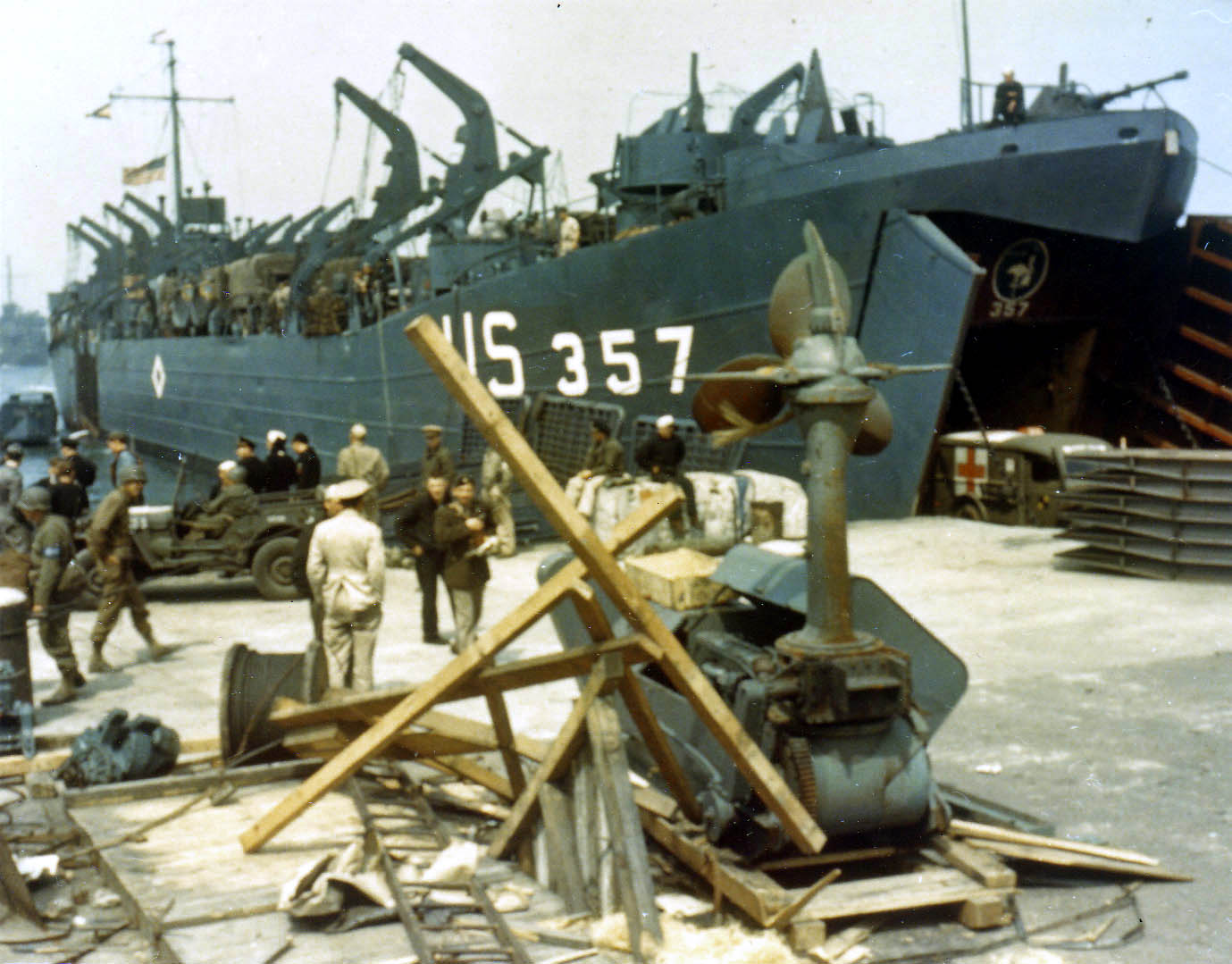
WC-54 being backed into an LST at the start of Operation Overlord.

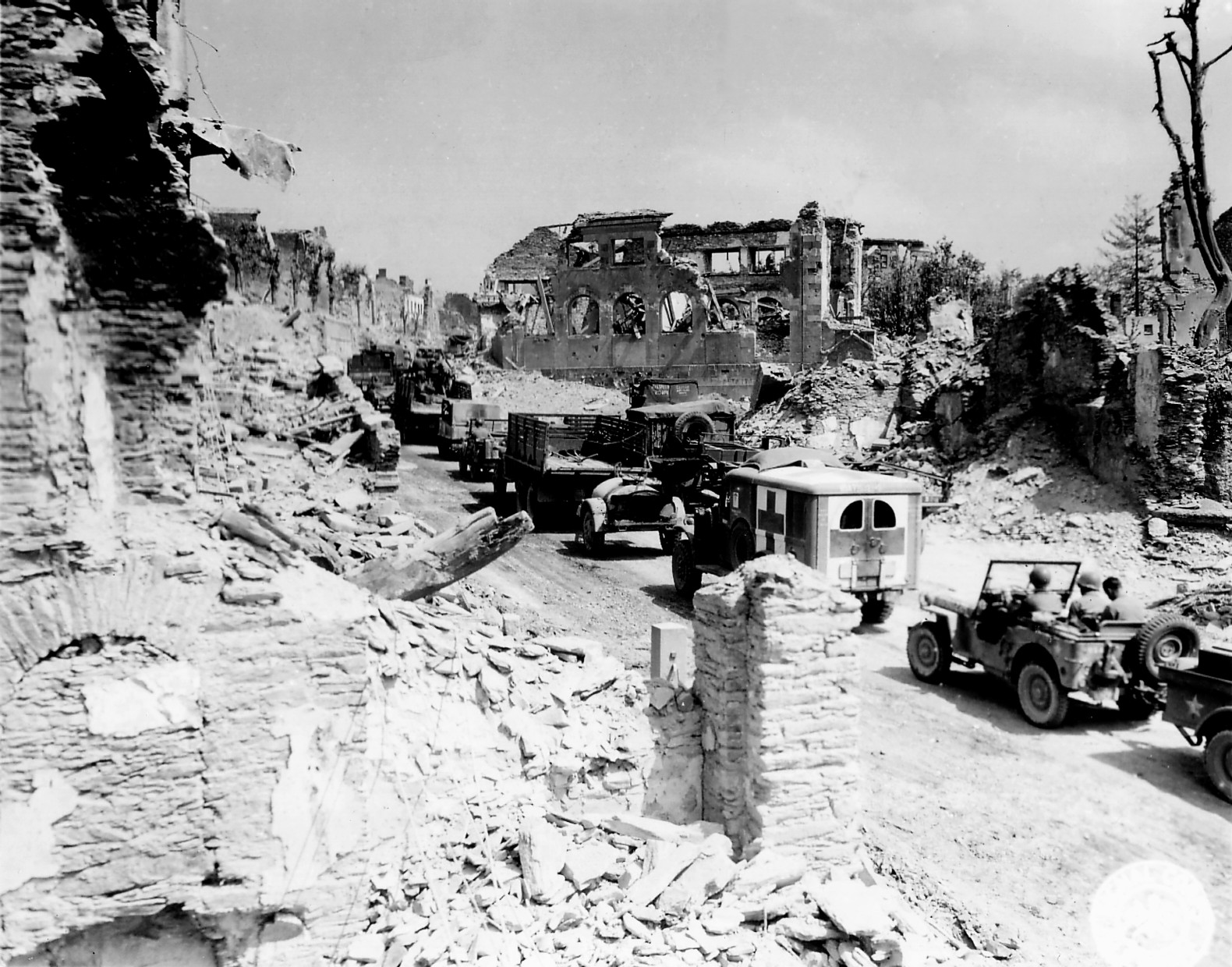
WC-54 in a convoy through devastated Saint Lo.

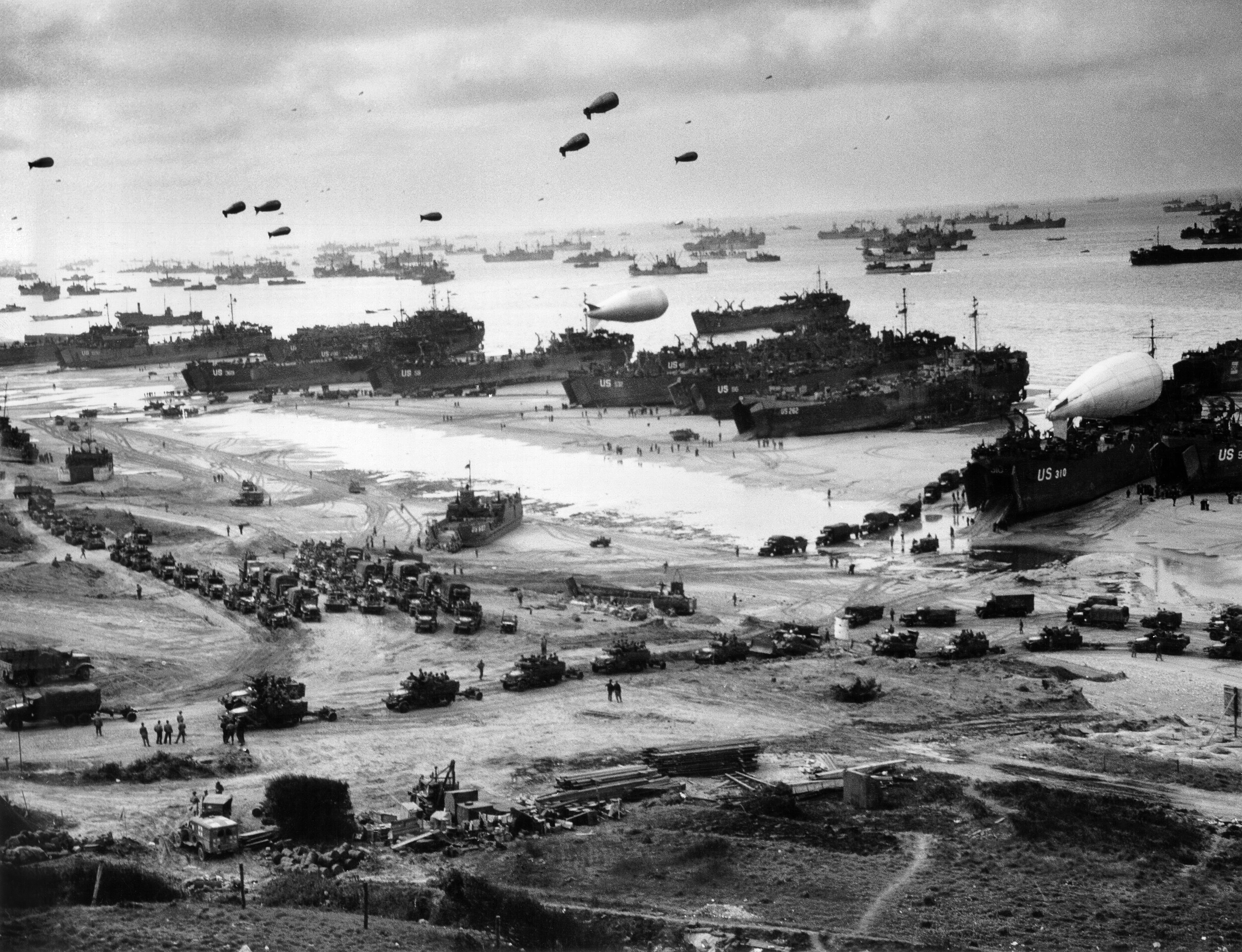
D-Day landings: WC-54 in the left foreground.

== See also ==
- Dodge WC series
- Austin K2/Y
- Dodge M37
- List of Dodge automobiles
- Military light utility vehicle
- G-numbers (G502)
- History of the ambulance
- Combat medic
