= Edward Dalton =

American physician

Edward Barry Dalton
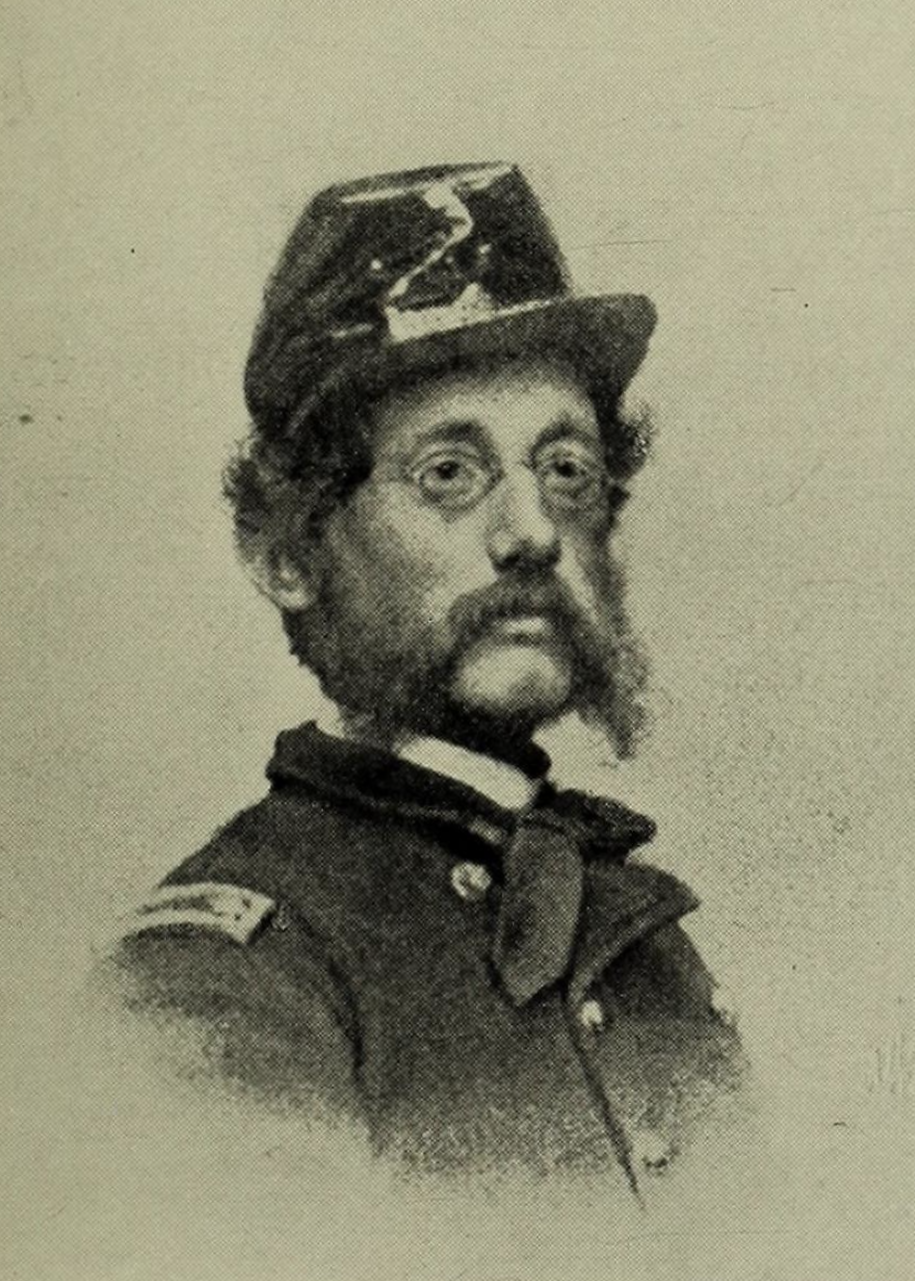
- Born: September 21, 1834; Lowell, Massachusetts, US
- Died: May 13, 1872 (aged 37); Santa Barbara, California, US
- Education: College of Physicians and Surgeons
- Occupation: Physician
- Known for: Created New York City's first ambulance service

Edward Barry Dalton (September 21, 1834 – May 13, 1872) was an American medical doctor who served in the American Civil War and created New York City's first ambulance service.

Dalton was born September 21, 1834, into a family of doctors in Lowell, Massachusetts. Upon graduating from the College of Physicians and Surgeons, he interned at Bellevue Hospital before joining the Union Army at the outbreak of the American Civil War. After having to briefly leave the army to recover from an illness—most likely malaria—he was tasked with overseeing the Army of the Potomac's field hospitals, which treated tens of thousands of ill and wounded soldiers.

After the war, Dalton became the superintendent of the newly formed Metropolitan Sanitary District in New York City, on the recommendation of Ulysses S. Grant who called him "the best man in the United States for this place." In that role, Dalton created a "Rapid Response" program to transport people suffering from cholera to hospital. An expanded system based on this program became the city's first ambulance brigade, transporting the sick and injured to Bellevue Hospital; the service was in operation by June 4, 1869. The initial ambulances were stagecoaches filled with "stretchers, a cabinet stocked with whiskey and bandages, a stomach pump for the poisoned and suicidal, and a straitjacket." The ambulances were put to extensive use during the Orange Riots.

Dalton had one child, who died in 1868; his wife died the next year. Dalton himself died in Santa Barbara, California in 1872. His brother published a written tribute that suggested "his renown would rest on his military service first and his efforts to arrest cholera second".

== Sources ==
- Bell, Ryan Corbett (2009). The ambulance: a history. McFarland & Co. ISBN 9780786438112.
- Oshinsky, David (2016). Bellevue: three centuries of medicine and mayhem at America's most storied hospital. Doubleday.
