= Christopher Landon (screenwriter) =

English screenwriter

- Born: Christopher Guy Landon; 29 March 1911; West Byfleet, Surrey, England
- Died: 26 April 1961 (aged 50); Frognal, London, England
- Education: Clare College, Cambridge
- Occupation: Author

Christopher Guy Landon (29 March 1911 – 26 April 1961) was a British novelist and screenwriter best known for the novel Ice Cold in Alex and its subsequent film adaptation.

== Biography ==
Landon was born in West Byfleet, Surrey. His father was a stockjobber of Huguenot descent and he was a distant cousin of the author Perceval Landon. He was educated at Lancing College and Clare College, Cambridge, where he studied medicine.

Landon served with the Royal Army Medical Corps and Royal Army Service Corps in North Africa during the Second World War. Granted a field commission, Landon ended the war as a captain and was granted an honorary promotion to Major when he relinquished his commission in 1951.

After the war, he wrote several novels, including Ice Cold in Alex, set in North Africa during World War II and made into the film of the same name in 1958; A Flag in the City, a fictional account of British intelligence destroying German fifth column operations in Persia; Stone Cold Dead in the Market; Hornet's Nest; Dead Men Rise Up Never; and Unseen Enemy (also known as The Shadow of Time).

He died of accidental alcohol and barbiturate poisoning at his home in Frognal in 1961, leaving a wife and three children.
