= 62nd Siege Battery, Royal Garrison Artillery =

62nd Siege Battery, RGA
- Cap Badge of the Royal Regiment of Artillery
- Active: 21 September 1915–1919
- Country: United Kingdom
- Branch: British Army
- Role: Siege Artillery
- Part of: Royal Garrison Artillery
- Garrison/HQ: Sheerness
- Engagements: Battle of the Somme; Operations on the Ancre; Battle of Bullecourt; Battle of Messines; Battle of Passchendaele; Battle of Estaires; Hundred Days Offensive

62nd Siege Battery was a heavy howitzer unit of Britain's Royal Garrison Artillery (RGA) formed in Kent during World War I. It saw active service on the Western Front at the Somme and on the Ancre, at Bullecourt, Messines and Passchendaele. The battery was overrun and lost its guns during the German Spring Offensive, but was re-equipped and took part in the final Allied Hundred Days Offensive.

== Mobilisation ==
On the outbreak of war in August 1914, units of the part-time Territorial Force (TF) were invited to volunteer for Overseas Service and the majority of the Kent Royal Garrison Artillery did so. Nos 1 and 2 Companies of this 'defended ports unit' were stationed in the Sheerness defences on the River Medway.

By October 1914, the campaign on the Western Front was bogging down into Trench warfare and there was an urgent need for batteries of siege artillery to be sent to France. The War Office decided that the TF coastal gunners were well enough trained to take over many of the duties in the coastal defences, releasing Regular Army RGA gunners for service in the field. Although the TF defended ports units never served overseas, the TF RGA companies that had volunteered for overseas service were soon supplying trained gunners to RGA units serving overseas and providing cadres to form complete units with 'New Army' (Kitchener's Army) volunteers.

62nd Siege Battery, RGA, was formed at Sheerness on 21 September 1915 with a cadre of Territorials drawn from the Kent RGA. Together with 61st Siege Bty it formed 'R' Siege Brigade on 18 October. 643 Company, Army Service Corps (ASC), formed 25 January 1916, was attached to 62nd Siege Bty to provide its motor transport. The battery was equipped with four 9.2-inch howitzers and was sent to the Western Front, arriving on 9 March 1916.

== Service ==
After disembarking its guns at Boulogne, the battery went by road to join 19th Heavy Artillery Group (HAG) with Third Army on the Somme and went into billets at Authieule on 15 March. Three days later, Right Section moved its first gun into position at St Amand near Pommier. By 20 March Right Section had positioned both guns, and Left Section was preparing its positions nearby at Monchiet. Right Section fired its first nine shells on 22 March to test its mountings and direction. By the end of the month all four guns were emplaced, but the front was quiet and the battery had little to do apart from registering its guns on various enemy trenches.

The ASC company was absorbed into the brigade's ammunition column on 25 April. The battery was reassigned to VII Corps Heavy Artillery on 11 May. When 96th Siege Bty arrived from the UK it took over 62nd Siege Bty's 9.2-inch howitzers in their emplacements on 25 May. The battery's personnel then joined X Corps with Fourth Army on 8 June

=== Somme ===
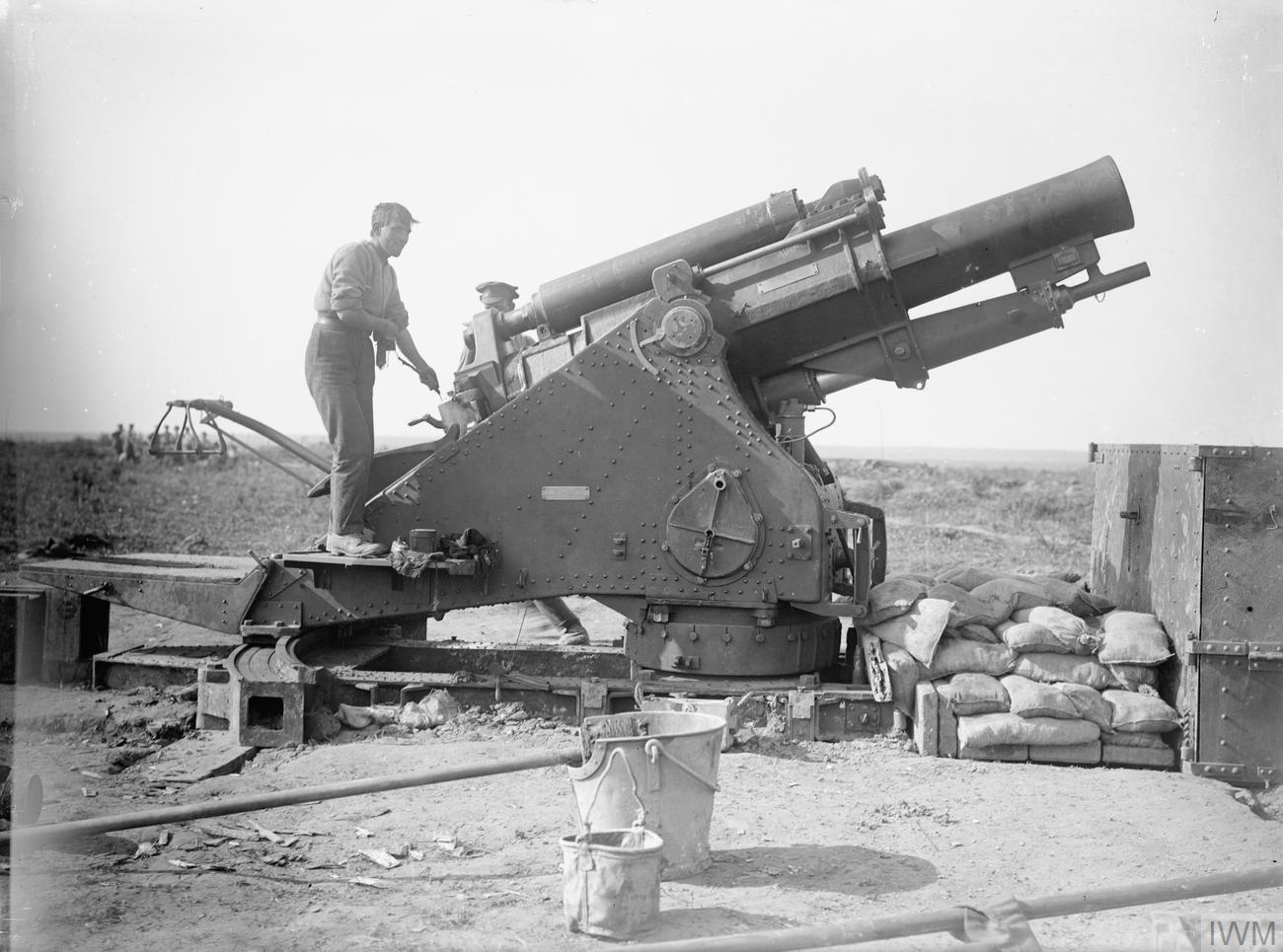
9.2-inch howitzer in action on the Somme, 1916.

X Corps was preparing for that summer's 'Big Push' (the Battle of the Somme). Its task would be to advance astride the River Ancre to capture the high ground in front. The corps heavy artillery's 'Northern Group', to which 62nd Siege Bty was attached, would support the attack of 36th (Ulster) Division up the Ancre valley and against the Schwaben Redoubt on the edge of the Thiepval plateau.

The bombardment programme was to extend over five days, U, V, W, X and Y, before the assault was launched on Z day. The strenuous work of firing the heavy guns and howitzers was divided into 2-hour periods to allow the gunners to rest, Forward Observation Officers (FOOs) to be relieved, and the guns to cool. The bombardment began on 24 June, but on several days the weather was too bad for good air or ground observation and the programme was extended by two days (Y1 and Y2).

At 06.25 on Z Day (1 July) the final bombardment began. When the infantry launched their assault at 07.30, 36th (Ulster) Division captured most of the German front and support positions without difficulty, and had advanced nearly a mile onto the ridge in the first hour, including the front part of the Schwaben Redoubt. However, St Pierre Divion had been hardly touched by the bombardment and machine guns in the village fired into the flank of the brigade trying to advance up the valley. The corps artillery plan was also too rigid: the heavy guns 'lifted' at set times from one objective to the next, and got away from some of the infantry, who received no benefit from their fire, while it hindered the successful Ulster brigade, which was ready to assault the German second line by 10.00 and had to wait under heavy fire until 10.10 for the barrage to cease. This allowed German reinforcements to arrive just in time. The division spent the rest of the day on the open plateau under heavy fire, with no support on its flanks and unable to get reinforcements or ammunition forward. German counter-attacks forced the abandonment of the redoubt that night. Over the next two days the gunners helped to collect the thousands of wounded left after the failed assault.

X Corps continued fighting on the Somme through July, now under the command of Reserve Army, including the battles for Bazentin Ridge, Ovillers and Pozières Ridge. It then handed over to II Corps, which took over the fighting for Pozières Ridge and then participated in the battles of Flers–Courcelette, Thiepval Ridge, and the Ancre Heights (when the Schwaben Redoubt was finally captured), and lastly the Battle of the Ancre, which closed the Somme Offensive in November.

=== Winter 1916–17 ===
62nd Siege Bty was still with Reserve Army (now renamed Fifth Army when 10th HAG took it over on 16 December. By this stage its two sections were widely separated, one still in the Ancre valley at the north east corner of Aveluy Wood (near group HQ at Bouzincourt), the other near Martinpuich, several kilometres to the east. Under 10th HAG the batteries continued harassing fire (HF) tasks against German positions – often against South Miraumont Trench for 62nd Siege Bty.

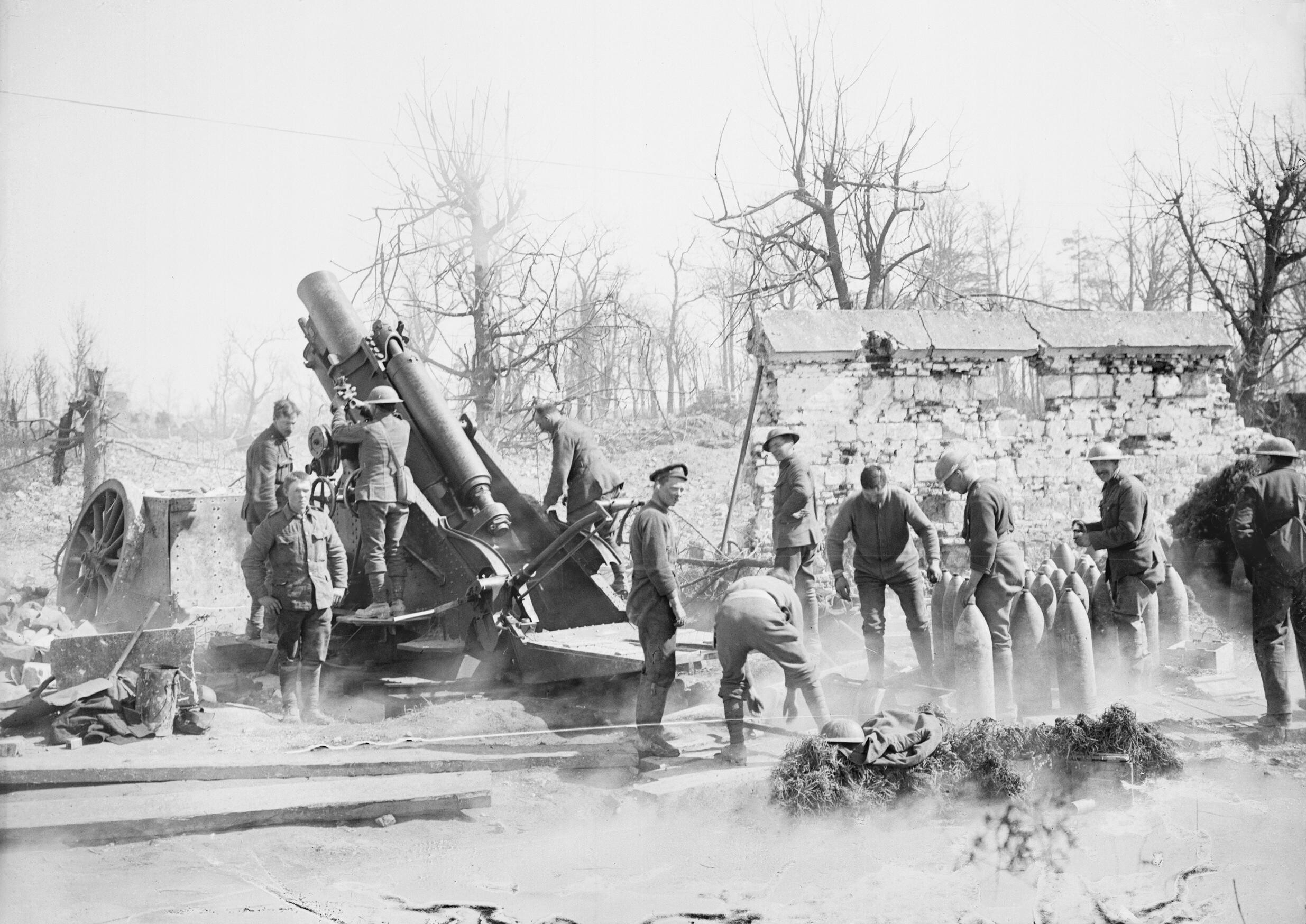
9.2-inch howitzer in action in early 1917.

Fifth Army renewed its operations on the Ancre in January 1917. On 9 and 10 January 10th HAG's fire swelled to a heavy bombardment in preparation for an attack by XIII Corps and by 11th (Northern) Division of IV Corps. It supported another attack by 11th (N) Division on 17 January, where the heavy artillery suppressed most of the resistance before the infantry arrived. There was now a round of reliefs, II Corps taking over from IV Corps, but the operations continued, with 62nd Siege Bty still firing on South Miraumont Trench until the end of the month, when the whole of 10th HAG concentrated on Boom Ravine, Miraumont Brickworks and the trenches of the Puisieux blocking system. 62nd Siege Bty transferred to 40th HAG on 2 February 1917 when that HQ moved into Bouzincourt and changed over with 10th HAG, but the firing remained the same, with 62nd concentrating on South Miraumont Trench. 63rd (Royal Naval) Division attacked the almost-obliterated Puisieux Trench on 3 February and held it against several counter-attacks, which were broken up with the aid of artillery fire. The group continued pounding the Miraumont and Grandcourt trenches as the infantry pushed forward in minor operations, capturing one commanding point after another. The largest of these were the Actions of Miraumont, carried out by II Corps on 17–18 February with the aim of giving Fifth Army ground observation of the enemy battery positions. At Zero hour Fifth Army's siege groups including 40th HAG were to bombard the enemy's rear lines, machine gun emplacements etc, but surprise had been lost and the Germans opened their own bombardment 45 minutes before Zero. Nevertheless, 18th (Eastern) Division forced its way into Boom Ravine, but 2nd Division was pushed back out of South Miraumont Trench. The main objective, Hill 130, remained uncaptured and casualties had been heavy. 62nd Siege Bty returned to shelling South Miraumont and Gudgeon trenches. It brought at third gun up to Martinpuich on 3 March and its fourth to Courcelette on the night of 9/10 March, where it was later joined by one from Martinpuich. 2nd and 18th (E) Divisions made another attack on 10 March and took Irles and the nearby Grevillers Trench with the support of 40th HAG. Operations on the Ancre came to an end on 13 March 1917 when the Germans began retreating to the Hindenburg Line. This planned withdrawal (Operation Alberich) had been brought forward by two weeks in this sector because of the British success at Irles. By 18 March they were out of range of all of 40th HAG's guns.

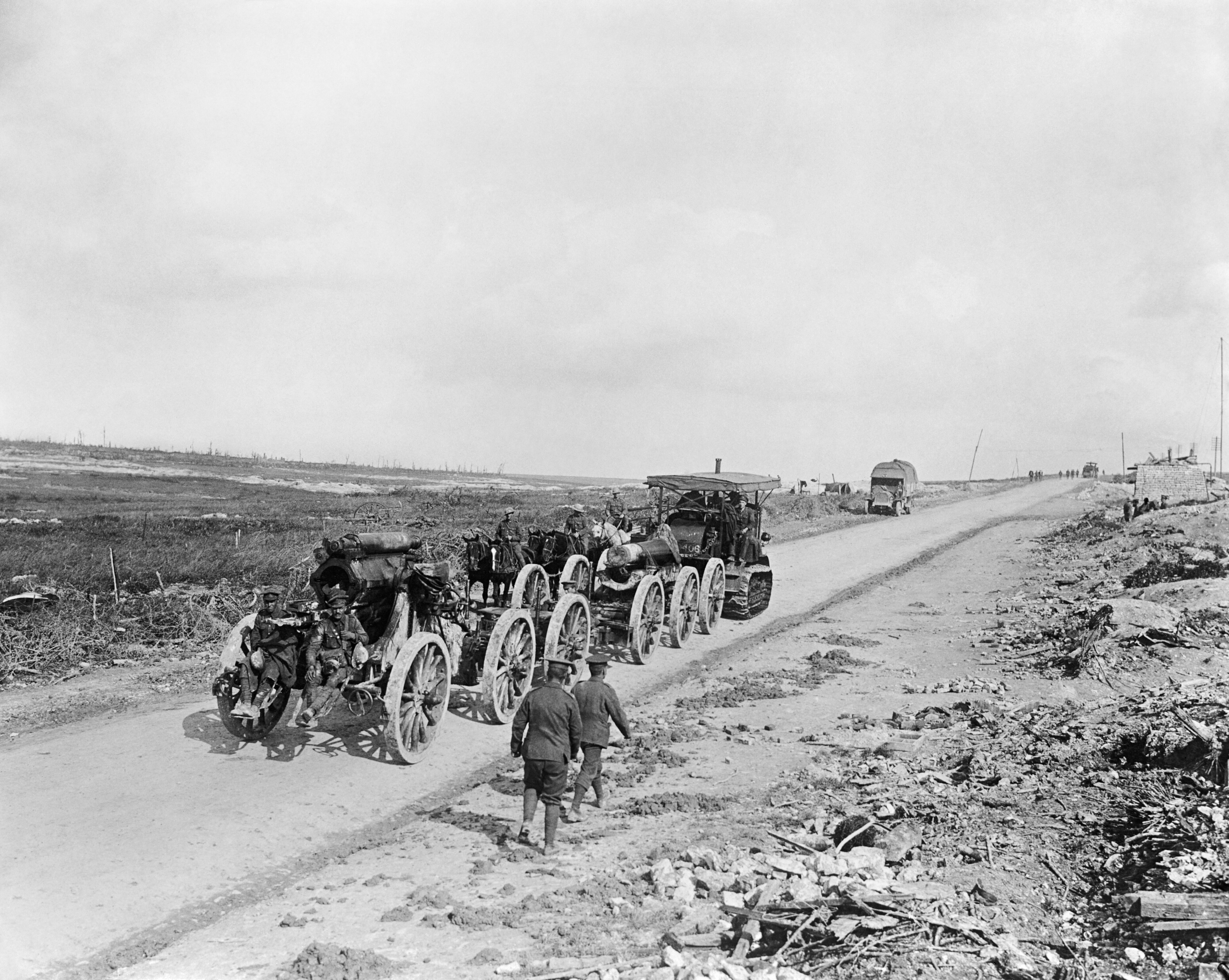
A Holt 75 caterpillar tractor hauling a 9.2-inch howitzer.

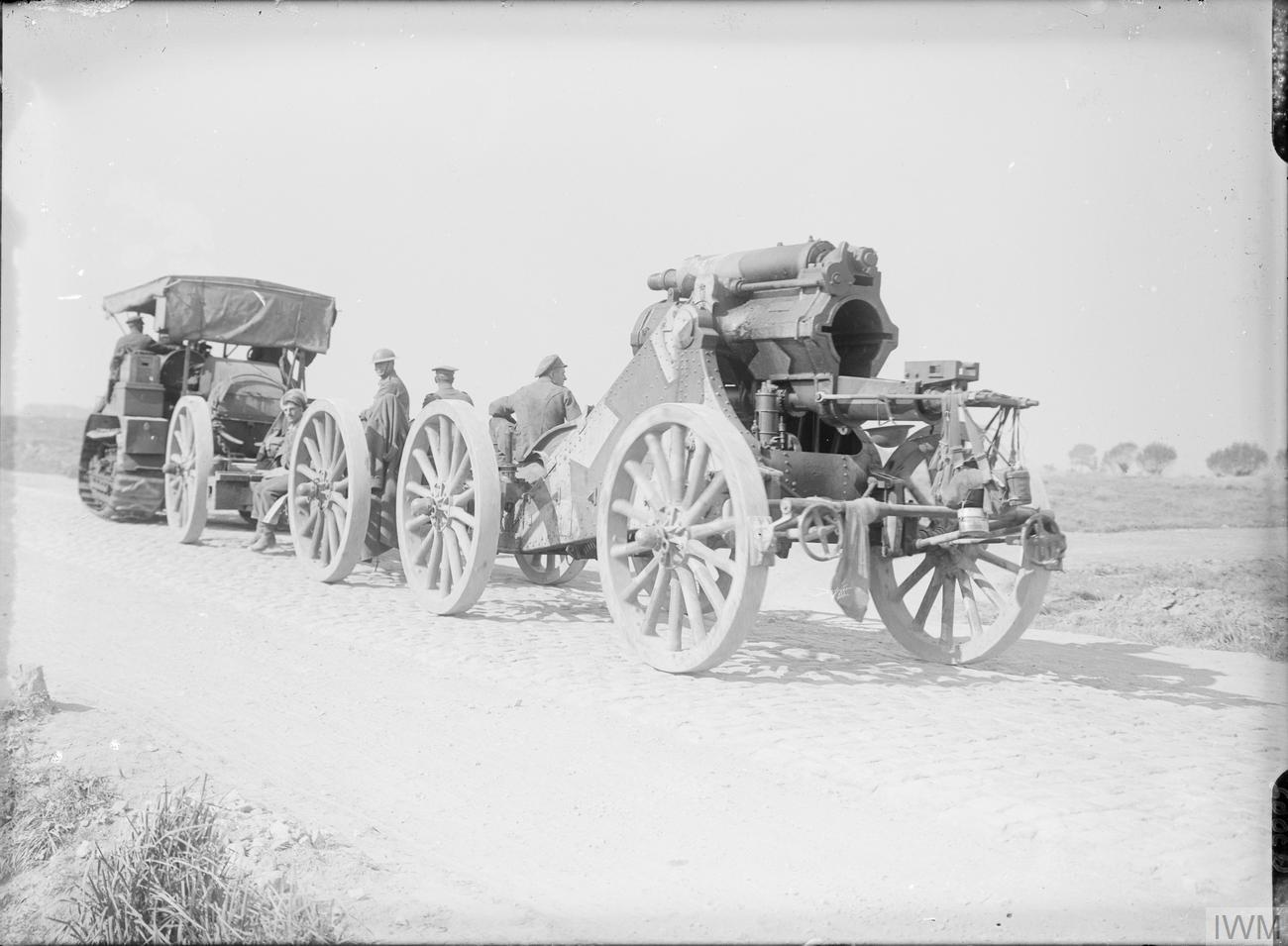
9.2-inch howitzer broken down into three loads for road movement.

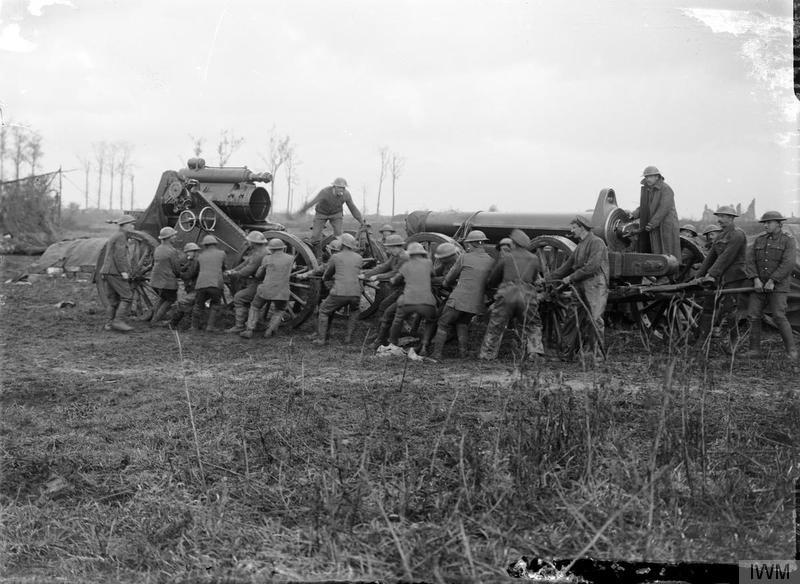
Moving a 9.2-inch howitzer onto its travelling carriage.

=== Bullecourt ===
Following the Germans caused huge problems for the artillery, which had to be dragged across the recent battlefields, and then the devastation caused by the retreating enemy. At the end of March 40th HAG moved north with V Corps where Fifth Army was to assist Third Army's Arras Offensive by attacking the end of the Hindenburg Line at Bullecourt, supported by every available heavy gun. The first heavy guns to arrive had to be used for wire-cutting because the field guns were initially kept out of range by German outposts. It does not appear that 62nd Siege Bty was able to join in until 21–22 April, after the First attack on Bullecourt, when it targeted a German anti-tank battery. On 23 April 40th HAG carried out vigorous Counter-battery (CB) fire to support an attack by the neighbouring VII Corps (part of Third Army's Second Battle of the Scarpe) with 62nd Siege Bty also firing into Fontaine-lès-Croisilles. The attack was a partial success. Over the next two days 62nd Siege Bty fired on a German strongpoint with the assistance of an observation aircraft, gaining several direct hits, and also participated in 'crash' barrages on hostile batteries. Thorough artillery preparation was undertaken for the renewed Battle of Bullecourt on 3 May. Roads had been improved, there was plentiful ammunition, and the CB fire was effective. But on V Corps' front 62nd (2nd West Riding) Division could not hold on to Bullecourt village, even with a protective barrage fired by the heavy guns. A fresh attack that evening by 7th Division was also driven back. The guns continued firing while further attempts were made over the next two weeks to take the village. It was finally evacuated by the Germans on 17 May. That night 62nd Siege Bty pulled out of its positions and began to move north to join Second Army in the Ypres Salient.

=== Messines ===
From 18 May 62nd Siege Bty was attached to 51st HAG with IX Corps at Loker. It arrived on 20 May and went into billets at Little Kemmel. Next day it lost three men killed and three other wounded when their billets were shelled. Second Army was preparing for the Battle of Messines with a huge artillery concentration. 51st HAG acted as a bombardment group, firing practice barrages across IX Corps' front from 1 June, and shelling the villages of Messines and Wytschaete and their neighbouring woods and strongpoints with observation by Kite balloons. 62nd Siege Bty suffered a few casualties from incoming fire. On Y Day (6 June) the tired gunners of 62nd Siege Bty were reinforced by half the men of the newly-arrived 312th Siege Bty to keep the guns firing. After this preparation the attack on 7 June was no surprise to the Germans; the shock element was provided by the explosion of 19 huge mines under their defences at 03.10. Simultaneously all the British guns began on their tasks, which for 51st HAG's batteries included adding their weight to the CB groups. There was little response by the German guns and IX Corps' infantry (16th (Irish), 19th (Western) and 36th (Ulster) Divisions) swept over the ridge past the Spanbroekmolen crater and captured the strongpoint of Wytschaete with ease. Artillery fire then broke up the German counter-attacks in the early afternoon. Second Army then pressed forward to take most of the German reserve trenches (the Oosttaverne Line) on the reverse slope of the ridge before nightfall.

=== Ypres ===
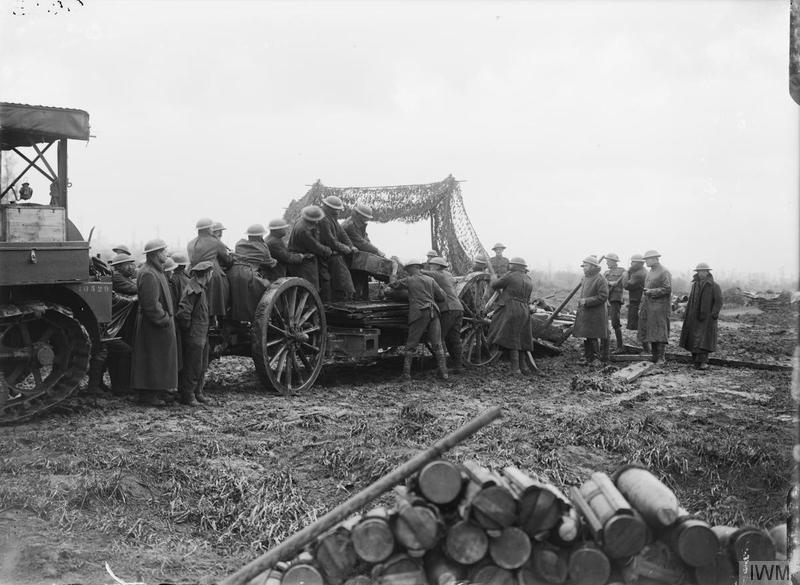
Hauling a 9.2-inch howitzer onto its travelling carriage.

After Messines the heavy artillery was reorganised for the forthcoming Third Ypres Offensive, with 62nd Siege Bty coming under the newly arrived 93rd HAG on 16 June. 93rd HAG transferred from IX Corps to XIV Corps with Fifth Army for the new operations.

XIV Corps' heavy guns were positioned between Elverdinge and Woesten, north of Ypres. The artillery duel had already begun on 12 June, and intensified as batteries were moved into position. The British batteries were badly exposed and the Germans had excellent observation posts (OPs) on the higher ground surrounding the salient. Both sides suffered heavily in the exchanges of CB fire. The heaviest artillery preparation began on 16 July. After delays caused by poor visibility, the offensive opened with the Battle of Pilckem Ridge on 31 July. On the northern flank of the attack, XIV Corps' attack was successful, despite heavy casualties, with Guards and 38th (Welsh) Divisions advancing from their positions along the Yser Canal, pushing through Pilckem to their third objective and taking up a line along the Steenbeek stream. However, the attacks further south had been less successful, and during the afternoon heavy rain set in, flooding the Steenbeek.

Resumption of the offensive on XIV Corps' front was delayed until 16 August (the Battle of Langemarck), when the infantry (20th (Light) and 29th Divisions) pushed out of the Steenbeek Valley to capture Langemarck itself. This, however, was an isolated success on an otherwise unsuccessful day. Next day 62nd Siege Bty came under the command of 23rd HAG, also with XIV Corps. The battery set up a joint OP with 41st Siege Bty and on 19 August the bombardment was renewed. Plans to move 62nd Siege Bty's howitzers up to the canal were shelved, to allow a CB battery to occupy the position. The batteries fired on 26–28 August in support of operations by the neighbouring corps, but almost no ground was gained. After the failures so far, Second Army took up the main direction of the offensive, and operations were paused for reorganisation. Meanwhile the guns continued firing on either side, taking a daily toll of casualties: on 4 September 62nd Siege Bty's commander, Maj W.H. Green, was slightly wounded but remained on duty. On the night of 11/12 September the whole of 23rd HAG was shelled with high explosive (HE) and gas.

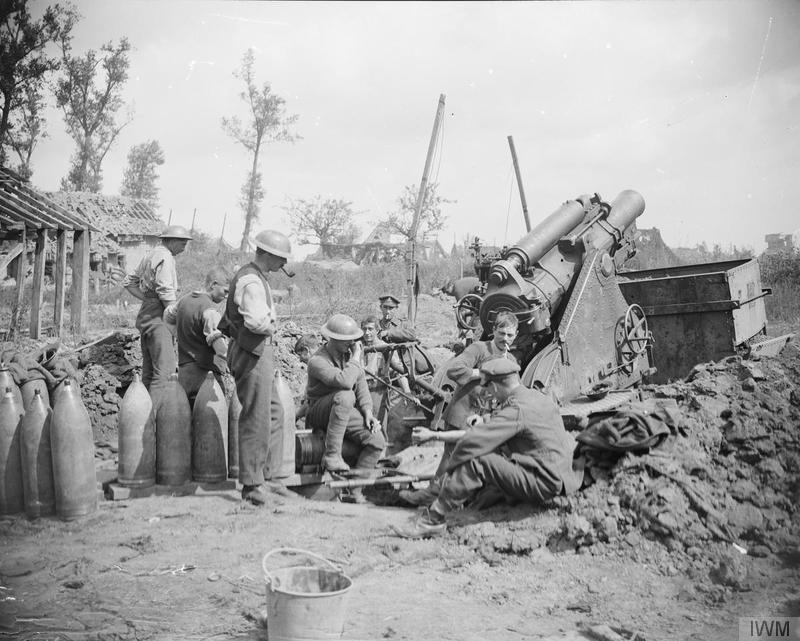
9.2-inch howitzer and crew, August 1917.

The offensive was renewed on 20 September with the Battle of the Menin Road Ridge. The new tactics emphasised stepwise attacks, allowing time for the heavy artillery to carry out CB tasks and to destroy concrete emplacements. 23rd HAG began a 'hurricane' bombardment on 19 September and continued until 08.40 next day, by which time XIV Corps' right-hand division (20th (Light)) had carried out its limited operation. The guns then fired a protective barrage as the infantry consolidated their gains. 23rd HAG then began bombarding concrete dugouts and strongpoints along the Broehmbeek to prepare for the next advance. 62nd Siege Bty got its first gun up to Boesinghe on the canal bank on 23 September, and a second next day. XIV Corps played a minor role in the next advance (the Battle of Polygon Wood, 26 September), with 23rd HAG firing a protective barrage across the divisional front. On 1 October 62nd Siege Bty was heavily shelled by German 5.9-inch howitzers for six hours: one gun was hit and its carriage damaged, some ammunition was set alight, and the fire spread to the ruins of Boesinghe, destroying several pairs of transport wheels; one gunner was killed. The Battle of Broodseinde on 4 October saw XIV Corps gain its limited objectives with very little opposition. Next day 62nd Siege Bty moved one of its howitzers across the Yser Canal, and a second two days later, but any movement of the heavy howitzers over the mud and shell-holes was extremely difficult and the ammunition lorries could not leave the road. The Battle of Poelcappelle on 9 October went well for XIV Corps, but the worsening conditions led to failure further south. By the time the attack was renewed on 12 October (the First Battle of Passchendaele) guns and ammunition were sinking in the mud, bombardments were thin and inaccurate, and CB fire had almost ceased, while the gunners continued to suffer casualties from enemy HE and gas. New forward positions selected for 62nd Siege Bty behind Abri Wood had to be cancelled on 17 October because the engineers could not lay a Decauville Railway to bring up ammunition. The battery struggled to get forward a section at a time – the Holt 75 caterpillar tractors became bogged – but orders arrived on 19 October to fire from whatever temporary positions they had reached. XIV Corps attacked in Houthulst Forest on 22 October with poor results. 23rd HAG was ordered to lay on a 48-hour bombardment for the next attack (the Second Battle of Passchendaele) on 26 October, but the infantry struggling through the mud failed to take their objectives.

=== Winter 1917–18 ===
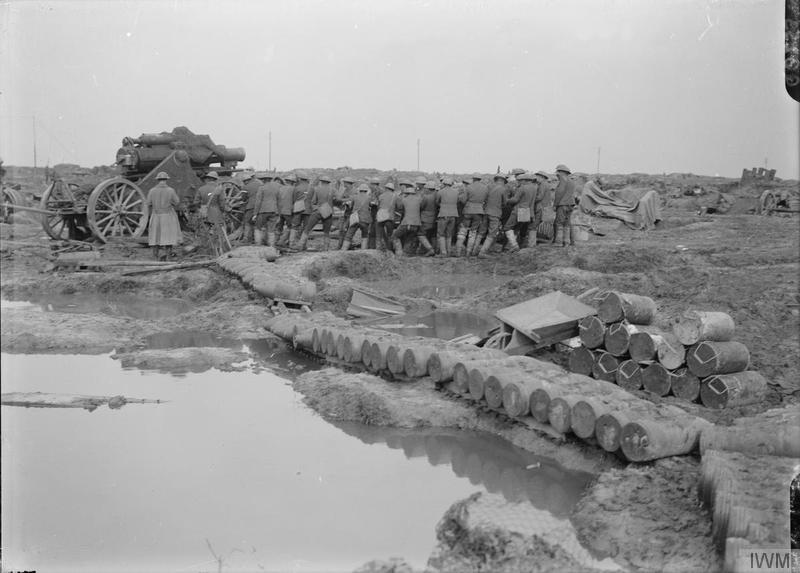
Positioning a 9.2-inch howitzer and its ammunition in the mud of the Ypres Salient, 1917.

Although the Battle of Passchendaele continued into November, 62nd Siege Bty took no further part. XIV Corps HQ was transferred to the Italian Front on 29 October, and 23rd HAG fell silent while the new headquarters took over. On 2 November the gunners of 175th Siege Bty arrived and relieved 62nd Siege Bty, taking over the howitzers where they were. The exhausted gunners went to a rest camp. During September 62nd Siege Bty had lost two officers and 14 other ranks (ORs) killed and wounded from a strength of 10 officers and 155 ORs, and in October another officer and 27 ORs.

The battery then joined 42nd HAG on 12 November, transferring to 45th HAG on 20 December (joining it on 24 December). By now HAG allocations were becoming more fixed, and during December 1917 they were converted into permanent RGA brigades. For the rest of the war the battery was the heaviest element in 45th (9.2-inch Howitzer) Brigade, RGA, along with three 6-inch howitzer batteries. 45th Brigade was located at Nouveau Monde Chateau, near Estaires, under First Army.

=== German Spring Offensive ===
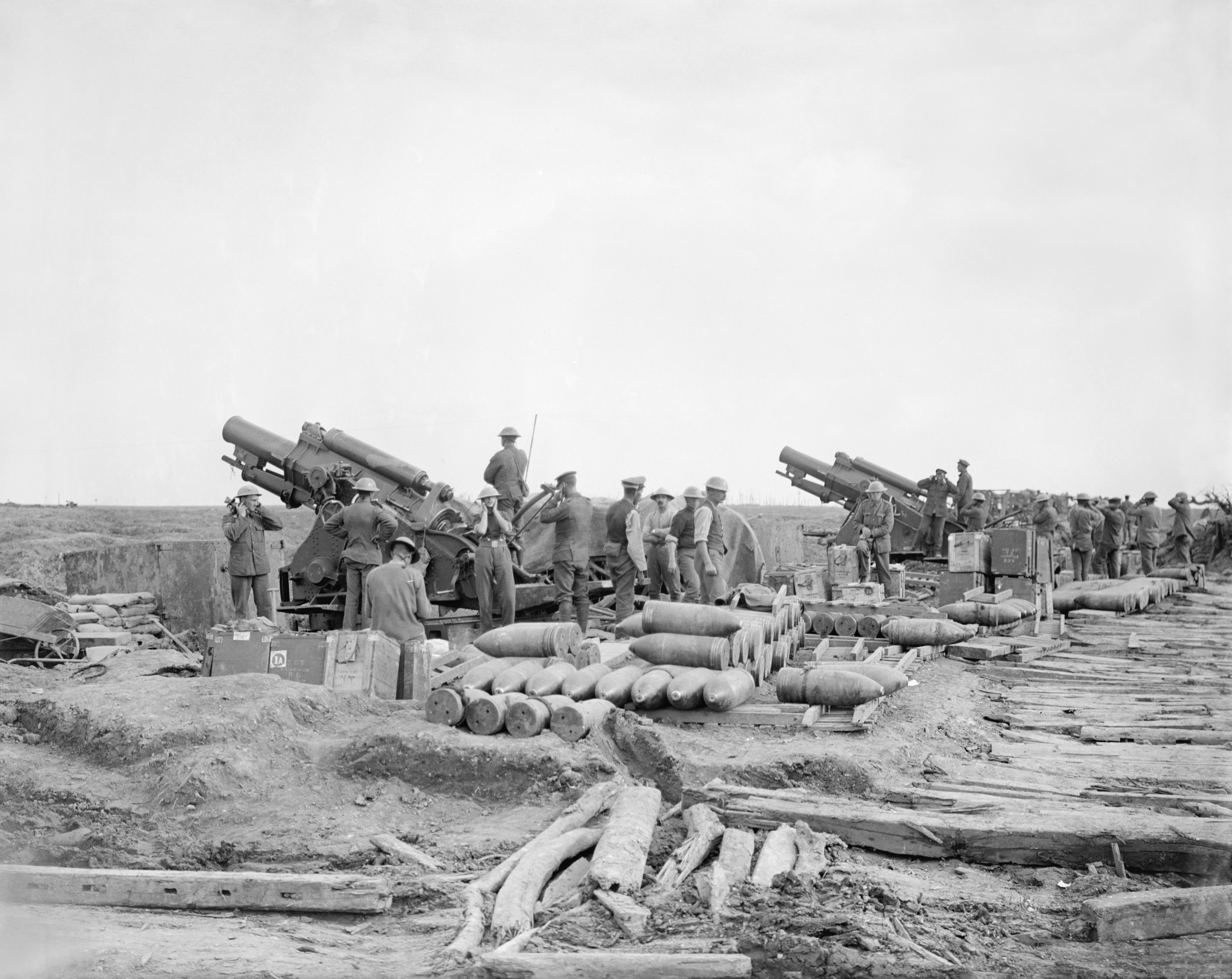
Section of 9.2-inch howitzers in action.

It was the end of January before 62nd Siege Bty got its last gun into position. There was little activity, apart from improving gun positions, firing a few registration shots, and occasionally supporting a trench raid. Enemy batteries became much more active in March and both sides engaged in CB fire, but the German Spring Offensive was directed further south, and First Army was hardly affected. However, when the second phase of the offensive (the Battle of the Lys) opened on 9 April it primarily hit First Army. It began at 04.15 with a violent bombardment of the British trenches and battery positions, and most communications were cut, although the line to 62nd Siege Bty lasted some time and it was used to pass orders along to nearby 32nd Siege Bty as the guns responded to SOS calls from the infantry. However, taking advantage of the morning mist, the Germans had overrun the 2nd Portuguese Division on XI Corps' front and were approaching the gun lines. At 62nd Siege Bty's advanced position one gun was out of action with parts in the workshop, but the other was kept firing until about 11.00, when the gunners manned their Lewis guns and buried the breechblock of their howitzer to prevent it falling into enemy hands. The two rearward guns survived in action until about 17.00 when their detachments removed the breechblocks and retired. The Germans crossed the River Lys near Estaires next day, and Armentières had to be evacuated, but by now reinforcements were arriving to shore up the line. The Battle of Estaires died down after 11 April and the Germans switched their attacks elsewhere.

There was a period of stalemate in the Estaires sector. While the 6-inch batteries of 45th Bde conducted a CB duel with German guns over the following weeks, 62nd Siege Bty without guns remained out of action. Officers acted as brigade liaison officers to other units and formations, and some of the gunners were billeted with 208th Siege Bty, suffering a number of casualties on 30 April when the battery command post was badly shelled. 62nd Siege Bty was re-equipped and back in action by mid-May, the fourth gun coming up on 20 May. CB and HF shoots continued until the end of June.

The German offensive having run its course, the BEF began small-scale offensive operations of its own. On the night of 26/27 June 62nd Siege Bty provided CB fire in support of a successful attack on Ankle Farm by 13th Battalion, York and Lancaster Regiment. Then on 28 June it supported XI Corps in Operation Borderland, a limited counter-attack on La Becque and other fortified farms in front of the Forêt de Nieppe, in what was described as 'a model operation' for artillery cooperation. The battery fired 376 CB rounds and also engaged several fleeting targets. After enemy CB fire came close to 32nd Siege Bty's positions during the night of 29/30 June, a retaliatory concentration was fired by every gun of the corps heavy artillery, with 62nd Siege Bty putting 30 rounds into the village of Merris, an HF task that it repeated over following days. On 1 July the camouflage netting over one of the battery's gun-pits caught fire, but 'gallant behaviour' by the gunners prevented it spreading to the cartridges and stores. The infantry put up an SOS on the evening of 4 July and 45th Bde fired for 25 minutes: the German attack was repulsed with heavy casualties.

By now 45th Bde came under XV Corps of Second Army. During July Second Army advanced its line slightly in a series of minor operations (including the capture of Merris) and by 21 July 62nd Siege Bty was preparing to moved forward.

=== Hundred Days Offensive ===
The Allies launched their Hundred Days Offensive on 8 August and Second Army joined in on 18 August. For several days 62nd Siege Bty had been putting 50 rounds a day into Outtersteene, then on the day of the attack it carried out bombardments, answered SOS calls and harassed German counter-attack troops moving up. At the end of the day the Outtersteene Ridge was in British hands, and 62nd Siege Bty moved one of its guns up to a forward position, two more the following night. The remaining objectives were cleared up on 19 August and as a result of the Outtersteene operation the Germans began to withdraw from their most threatened positions across a wide front. XV Corps felt its way forward, the guns firing a few concentrations, and by 30 August the patrols had lost contact with the enemy.

While 45th Bde advanced with the lighter 6-inch howitzers, the 9.2s of 62nd Siege Bty were left behind and the gunners rested. By 14 September it had moved further north and was temporarily attached to 1st Bde under XV Corps. It initially had two guns in action in the exchanges of CB fire on that front. On 18 September 31st Division carried out an operation to capture Soyer Farm, for which the howitzers provided a barrage, and then harassed the heavy traffic on the roads in the enemy's rear areas. 62nd Siege Bty pulled its other two guns up into position on 20 September, but enemy activity was slackening as they fell back towards the Hindenburg Line. 1st Brigade had 62nd Siege Bty's 9.2s pounding the Germans' temporary bridges over the Lys, and all the batteries began choosing forward positions in case of a general advance.

The Allies now planned a coordinated series of attacks, with Second Army joining in on 28 September (the Fifth Battle of Ypres). 1st Brigade's guns fired in support of the attack on Messines, then kept up night and day HF on German communications. 62nd Siege Bty reverted to the command of 45th Bde on 30 September and remained with it for the rest of the war. 45th Bde had an OP in Messines overlooking the lower ground as far as Quesnoy-sur-Deûle and 62nd Siege Bty was ordered to reconnoitre positions in Ploegsteert ('Plug Street'). Meanwhile it continued with HF tasks against the Quesnoy road and station. On 3 October troops recrossed the Lys and pushed past Armentières, which was unoccupied. Next day the 6-inch batteries began to move back to the Saint-Omer area, while 62nd Siege Bty remained in position to shell enemy dumps at Quesnoy with the aid of observation aircraft. It pulled out on 5 October on the completion of this shoot and moved to Racquinghem, leaving guards on the guns at Ploegsteert. Second Army continued its pursuit with light artillery.

The brigade carried out training at Racquinghem until 19 October when lorries arrived to transport the batteries back to the battle front, which had advanced considerably. Second Army was now planning a new set-piece attack across the Schelde. 62nd Siege Bty was billeted in Steenwerck, north of Lille, and the guns were brought up from Ploegsteert to Linselles on 25 October. However, the advance was now so rapid that it was difficult to bring heavy artillery into action, and XV Corps was being squeezed out of the narrowing battle front. The brigade remained in Linselles until 3 November when it moved to Tourcoing, and then to Lannoy on 6 November. Next day the batteries began moving by sections to action positions, but the caterpillar tractor towing one of 62nd Siege Bty's 9.2s became 'hopelessly ditched'. Reconnaissance parties went out to make contact with the infantry operating in front. By the time the guns were in position and the ammunition lorries had come up, orders arrived on 10 November to pull the guns out again. Next day hostilities were ended by the Armistice with Germany.

=== Post-Armistice ===
The battery spent the winter in Lannoy, and demobilisation began, until it had been reduced to a cadre. In the interim order of battle for the postwar Regular Army produced in May 1919, the cadre of 62nd Siege Battery, RGA, was to form the basis of 138th Battery in XXXV Brigade, RGA, but these plans were abandoned after the Treaty of Versailles was signed in June, and the cadre was disbanded. The Commonwealth War Graves Commission lists 29 members of the battery who died during the war (there may be others listed simply as RGA where the battery was not recorded). The majority (15) of the dead date from the period September–October 1917 during the Third Ypres Offensive.

== See also ==
- Newsreel film of a 9.2-inch howitzer being fired.
