= 41st Siege Battery, Royal Garrison Artillery =

41st Siege Battery, RGA
- Cap Badge of the Royal Regiment of Artillery
- Active: 2 July 1915 – 31 January 1920
- Country: United Kingdom
- Branch: British Army
- Role: Siege Artillery
- Part of: Royal Garrison Artillery
- Garrison/HQ: Plymouth
- Engagements: Battle of the Somme; Battle of Vimy Ridge; Battle of Messines; Third Battle of Ypres; German Spring Offensive; Battle of Albert; Battle of St Quentin Canal; Battle of the Selle; Battle of the Sambre

41st Siege Battery, was a heavy howitzer unit of the Royal Garrison Artillery (RGA) formed at Plymouth, during World War I. Half its personnel were Regular Army gunners returned from colonial garrisons in Asia, the remainder were Territorials from County Durham. It saw active service on the Western Front at the Battle of the Somme, where it suffered heavy casualties, at Vimy Ridge, Messines (where it again sustained heavy casualties) and Ypres. Several of its guns were overrun in the fighting against the German Spring Offensive, but it was refitted and participated in the Allies' final Hundred Days Offensive. It remained in the Regular Army after the war until it was absorbed into another unit in 1920.

== Mobilisation and training ==
On the outbreak of war in August 1914, much of the British Army was scattered in colonial garrisons and it took some time to bring them back to Europe to fight on the Western Front. In the meantime units of the part-time Territorial Force (TF) were invited to volunteer for Overseas Service, and most did so. By October 1914, the Western Front campaign was bogging down into Trench warfare and the British Expeditionary Force (BEF) had an urgent need for batteries of siege artillery. Soon the TF RGA companies that had volunteered for overseas service were supplying trained gunners to RGA units serving overseas.

41st Siege Battery was formed in Plymouth on 2 July 1915, half the strength being Regular troops returned from the garrisons of Hong Kong and Singapore and half from Territorials of the Durham RGA.

The Hong Kong–Singapore Royal Garrison Artillery (HKSRGA) dated from 1845 when gunners had been recruited from India to join the RGA company in garrison in Hong Kong. This had expanded to a full battalion manning the coastal defences of the colonies of Hong Kong, Singapore, Ceylon and Mauritius. The companies had a few British officers and senior non-commissioned officers. In addition, there were three Regular RGA companies in Hong Kong (Nos 83, 87 and 88) and two in Singapore (Nos 78 and 80).

The Durham RGA dated back to 1860. It was responsible for manning batteries of fixed coastal guns on the River Tees and at Hartlepool. It had already seen action when a German naval force had mounted a Raid on Scarborough, Hartlepool and Whitby on 16 December 1914.

Major H.C. Hall, who had been commanding No 83 Company, RGA, in Hong Kong on the outbreak of war, was appointed Officer Commanding (OC) of the new battery. The rest of the original officers were Territorials, including the second-in-command, Captain O.L. Trechmann, previously commanding No 4 Company of the Durham RGA at Hartlepool.

On 28 July the battery went to the RGA camp at Lydd for training, and then on 5 October it moved to Portsmouth for mobilisation. Here, (together with 40th Siege Bty) it formed 34th Siege Brigade. Equipment was short, so mobilisation was slow and the battery continued training. Early on it received one of the new Vickers BL 6-inch 26 cwt howitzers, which the battery took to Salisbury Plain for practice firing and to test the new design of gun carriage. The battery's other three guns did not arrive until the end of November.

== Service ==
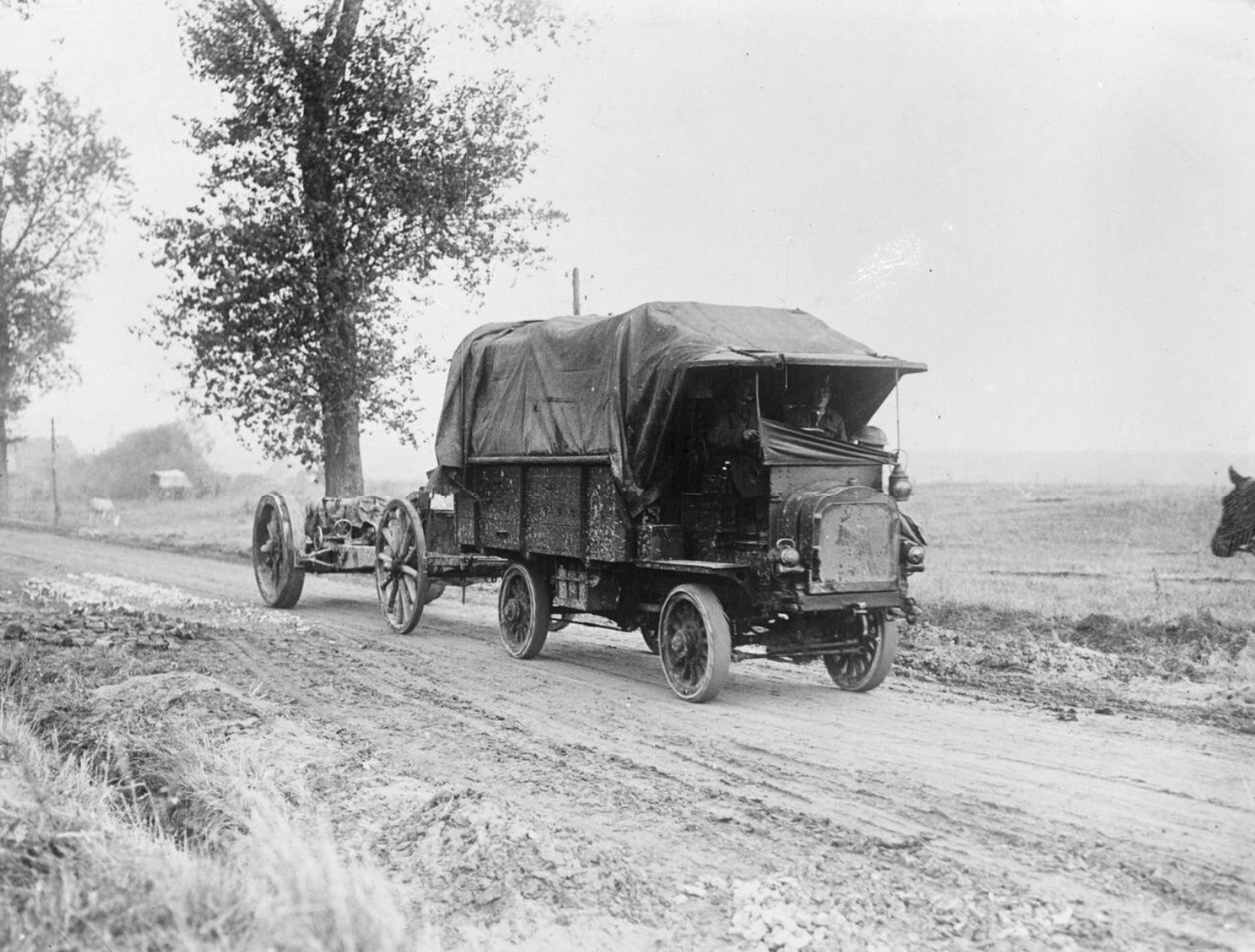
FWD Model B lorry towing a 6-inch 26 cwt howitzer. 41st Siege Bty was the first unit to be issued with this new gun.

The battery sailed from Portsmouth for France with 34th Brigade on 9 December 1915, arriving at Le Havre next day. The guns and motor transport (including FWD Model B gun tractors) arrived aboard the SS Blackwall from Avonmouth Docks five days later. 34th Brigade was assigned to II Corps at Hazebrouck. The battery personnel went by train while the guns followed by road. They were positioned at Lameron Farm, near Pont-de-Nieppe, on 24 December. These were the first 26-cwt 6-inch howitzers to arrive in France, and Staff-Sergeant Moore from Vickers was attached to the battery for two months while they were assessed. The battery had numerous visitors curious to see the new guns in action. After completing the gun positions, the battery began registering its guns on 'the Blanchisserie' on 30 December.

The battery continued registration and practice shoots on various targets during January 1916. From its position it was able to cover the whole of II Corps' front. On 24 January it supported a minor operation by 21st Division, firing 50 rounds each at a farm and some buildings at Frelinghien, achieving a high proportion of direct hits. Over the following weeks the battery fired a few rounds most days, on a variety of targets, such as 'Fort Bismarck', 'Crown Prince Farm' and 'The Birdcage'. On one occasion an observation aircraft made a 'ZZ' call requesting urgent fire, the target of which turned out to be an active anti-aircraft battery. On another, a field artillery battery requested fire on a hostile battery it could see shelling British positions: this was successfully silenced. For long periods from mid March to late April the battery was forbidden to fire because of the shortage of ammunition. Supply improved in May, and the battery was increasingly used for counter-battery (CB) fire.

RGA brigades were redesignated Heavy Artillery Groups (HAGs) in April 1916, and the policy now was to move batteries between them as required. Left Section (LX) of 41st Siege Bty and a section of 40th Siege Bty were detached to 32nd HAG with IV Corps at Pont d'Achelles from 19 May. On 31 May LX moved into Bouvigny Wood under cover of darkness, and carried out CB fire on 1 June. Next day it carried out a 'trench Strafe' against Vimy Ridge, where fighting had flared up on 21 May. While Left Section was away, Right Section (RX) did very little firing.

=== Somme ===
34th HAG and its batteries were now sent south. 41st Siege Bty was transferred to 25th HAG on 5 June, joining it at Albert on 15 June, with its two sections arriving separately and taking over emplacements from 17th Siege Bty on the next two days. As the battery began registering its guns on 20 June Maj Hall was posted to command 10th HAG and Capt M. Sykes was promoted from 27th Siege Bty to take command of 41st Siege Bty.

25th HAG was attached to X Corps in Fourth Army, which was preparing for that summer's 'Big Push' (the Battle of the Somme), with the group preparing new observation posts (OPs) and gun positions. X Corps' task was to advance astride the River Ancre to capture the high ground in front, with 36th (Ulster) Division attacking up the river valley towards the Schwaben Redoubt and 32nd Division assaulting Thiepval and the Leipzig Redoubt before advancing to Mouquet Farm ('Mucky Farm'). The bombardment programme was to extend over five days, U, V, W, X and Y, before the assault was launched on Z day. The strenuous work of firing the heavy guns was divided into 2-hour periods to allow the gunners to rest, Forward Observation Officers (FOOs) to be relieved, and the guns to cool. The bombardment began on 24 June, 41st Siege Bty firing 800 rounds per day on its assigned tasks against front, support and communication trenches in the Thiepval Salient, observed from an OP in Mesnil-Martinsart. The firing was so intense that on 29 June three of the battery's guns were out of action at various times with leaking hydro-pneumatic recuperators. Poor quality 6-inch ammunition was also causing problems, with frequent misfires and 'blinds' that failed to explode. But on several days the weather was too bad for good air or ground observation and the programme was extended by two days (Y1 and Y2), when the battery only fired 400 rounds per day.

At 06.25 on Z Day (1 July) the final bombardment began. When the infantry launched their assault at 07.30, 36th (Ulster) Division captured most of the German front and support positions without difficulty, and advanced nearly a mile onto the ridge in the first hour, including the front part of the Schwaben Redoubt. However, St Pierre Divion had been hardly touched by the bombardment and machine guns in the village fired into the flank of the brigade trying to advance up the valley. 32nd Division found the barbed wire well cut and seized the front face of the Leipzig Redoubt, but it too was caught in enfilade while trying to advance further. The corps artillery plan was also too rigid: the heavy guns 'lifted' at set times from one objective to the next, and got away from the infantry, who received no benefit from their fire. By 09.40 41st Siege Bty was firing on a trench line north of Goat Redoubt when it got word that the infantry were held up, and it was ordered to stay on this target until 11.00, when it lifted onto the village of Courcelette. Then at 12.30 it was ordered to return to the German support trenches, which the infantry had still not captured. By 14.45 the battery only had one gun still in action because of overheating, and it was realised that 'the attack on Thiepval had been a complete failure'. At nightfall the 36th Division had been forced out of the Schwaben redoubt, and 32nd Division was left clinging onto the edge of the Thipeval spur and the front face of the Leipzig Redoubt. Over the next two days the gunners helped to collect the thousands of wounded left after the failed assault.

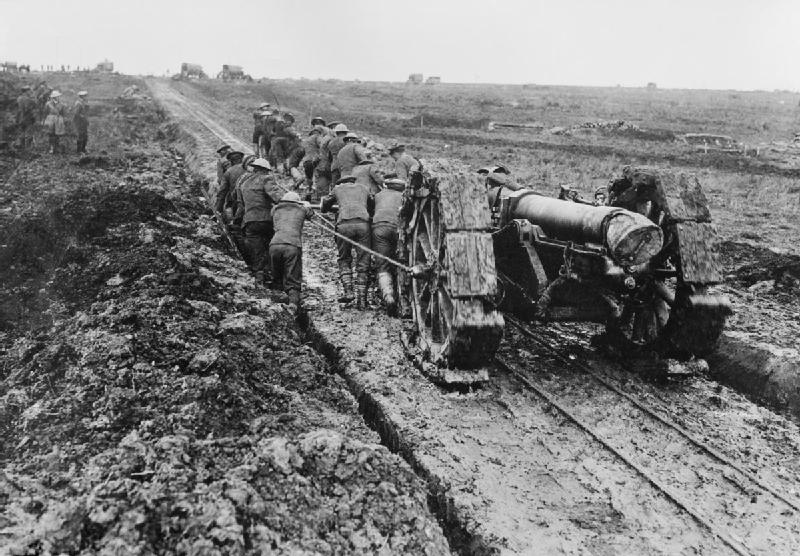
6-inch howitzer being moved through mud on the Somme, 1916.

Reserve Army now took over this sector of the front, and X Corps continued attacking south of the Ancre, including the fighting round Ovillers, supported by 41st Siege Bty. On 14 July a party unloading ammunition at RX's position were caught by a single German 'Five-Nine' shell: (Note: German 5.9-inch or 150 mm guns – usually 15 cm sFH 13s.) one officer and 12 Other Ranks (ORs) of the battery were killed or died of wounds and another seven ORs wounded, as well as casualties among the Army Service Corps and an infantry working party. Another unlucky shell on 17 July caught RX's billet at lunch time, resulting in another man dead and 15 wounded.

41st Siege Bty resumed bombarding Pozières on 22 July before the infantry attacked next day (the Battle of Pozières Ridge). II Corps took over the sector on 27 July, and continued the fighting for Pozières Ridge. The British CB work around Courcelette had been particularly effective, which assisted I ANZAC Corps' attacks on Pozières village. On 31 July RX moved up to join LX, and through early August the battery continued firing on trenches around Thiepval Chateau, and Mucky Farm as 48th (South Midland) and 4th Australian Divisions slowly worked their way forward. II Corps attacked up the Ancre towards Thiepval once more on 3 September, but failed to progress, and then cooperated in the battle of Flers–Courcelette (15 September). After a four-day pause, 41st Siege Bty registered new targets with the help of a Kite balloon and then began pounding Bulgar Trench, the Zollern Redoubt and Stuff Redoubt in preparation for the Thiepval Ridge beginning on 26 September. Mucky Farm was finally captured by 11th (Northern) Division and Zollern Trench by 18th (Eastern) Division on the first day, and Stuff Trench and Thiepval village next day.

On 29 September RX of 41st Siege Bty moved forward to a position near Ovillers, followed by LX on 1 October. After digging in, the battery registered new targets in support of the continuing Battle of the Ancre Heights, still using the OP in Mesnil. Over the following days it bombarded hostile batteries, the Schwaben Redoubt and Puisieux Trench. The Schwaben Redoubt was finally captured on 14 October, and on 21 October, after an effective methodical bombardment, the rest of Stuff Trench was taken. The Somme Offensive closed with the Battle of the Ancre. As well as its CB work, 41st Siege Bty shelled the Hansa Line for three weeks before the assault by II Corps on 13 November: the infantry found there was nothing left of the trench and were able to mop up many prisoners trapped against the flooded Ancre valley by the artillery fire. Finally, the battery fired in support of the attack on Serre and Beaumont-Hamel on 18 November, the remaining objectives from the first day of the Somme.

=== Winter 1916–17 ===
On 6 November Capt Sykes had been transferred to command the railway guns of 63rd Siege Bty and Capt Trechmann assumed command of 41st Siege Bty and was later promoted to major. Through November and December the battery's targets were usually Puisieux and River Trenches. On 21 December the battery was ordered to pull out next morning and hand its positions over to 157th Siege Bty just arrived from England. It went by road to Savy in the Arras sector, arriving on 26 December and joining 70th HAG. The battery's guns were inspected and Nos 1–3 (serial numbers 301–3, the first three of the model delivered from Vickers) were condemned as worn out, while No 4 (s/n 304) was overhauled and put back into service. The battery was sent to rest billets in St-Aubin and men were given leave. New guns were delivered in January 1917 and the gunners prepared new positions and OPs, but on 26 January the battery was ordered to move again.

The battery moved north by road to Vlamertinghe, behind Ypres, where it joined 53rd HAG in Second Army holding the Ypres Salient. After digging in and camouflaging the guns, they were registered on Pilckem Mill and hostile batteries. However, the battery was moved again on 17 February, via Poperinghe and Steenvoorde to Morbecque in First Army's area. Here the battery was ordered to split, with HQ and RX going to 70th HAG at Louez and LX to I Corps' heavy artillery. Leaving one gun in the workshops, LX with a single gun went to Béthune, then spent the remainder of February and March firing from various positions around Vermelles. The rest of the battery joined 70th HAG, then was transferred to 77th HAG under Canadian Corps and went to St Aubin, where it prepared battery positions while its guns were in the workshops. The guns were pulled into position on 18 March.

=== Vimy Ridge ===
Left Section rejoined the rest of the battery at St Aubin on 31 March. Right Section had been registering its guns on Thélus Mill, various trenches and suspected enemy HQs when visibility permitted. First Army was preparing for the Arras Offensive, with the Canadian Corps tasked with taking Vimy Ridge. In the days before the attack (9 April) prodigious quantities of ammunition were expended on enemy trenches, strongpoints, wire and batteries. The attack went in at 05.30 with a heavy barrage; while the field artillery fired a creeping barrage in front of the advancing infantry, the 6-inch howitzers fired a standing barrage on the Phase 1 objective (the enemy front line trenches). Then, while the creeping barrage rolled over the objective, the howitzers lifted onto the Phase 2 objectives and so on. With this support the Canadians overran three lines of German trenches and seized the crest of the ridge, on the forward slope of which 41st Siege Bty established an OP the following day.

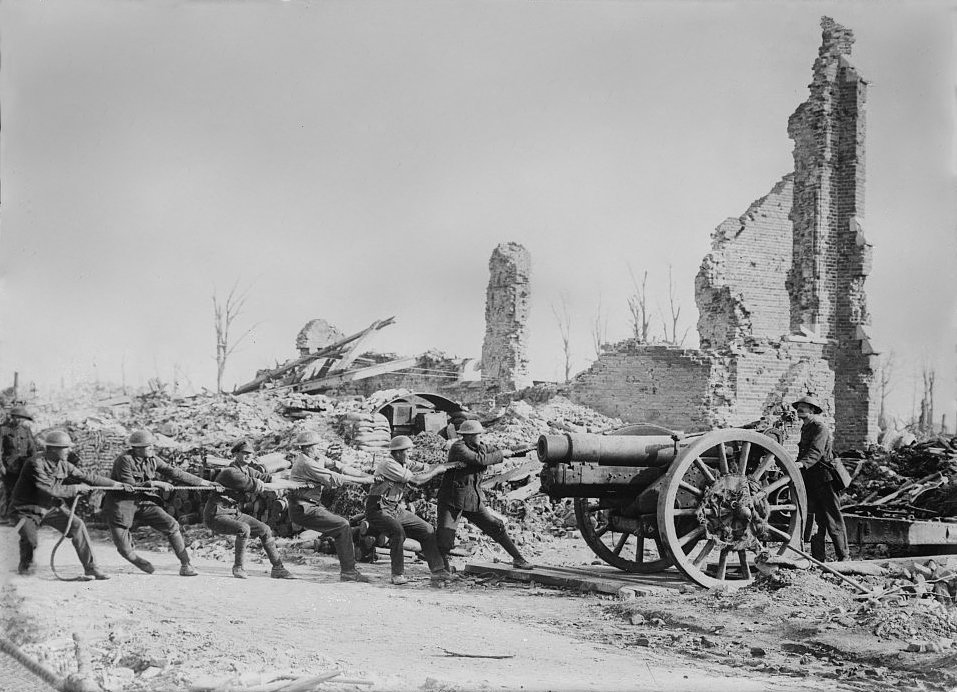
Gunners manhandling a 6-inch howitzer.

There was little exploitation from Vimy as the emphasis of the offensive shifted to Third Army further south. After some firing on Vimy village and night harassing fire, 41st Siege Bty pushed two guns forward on 12 April to the main Arras–Béthune road behind Écurie. Two days later the other two guns followed, then on 16 April the battery was ordered to move in front of Écurie. But although it prepared a forward position on a ridge behind Thélus, the roads across the old No man's land were too bad to allow the guns to be pulled in. Eventually two guns were dragged to a position in front of Thélus where there was no cover. Here the battery was heavily shelled, an officer and a gunner killed, and five other men wounded. The battery was given permission to shift 500 yards (460 m) over the drying ground to get behind cover. However, it was still under shellfire, losing the Battery Sergeant Major and another man killed and four others wounded. Two guns were hit on 23 April, one requiring workshop repair, and the battery was ordered to move yet again. The new position was better, but with poor facilities for ammunition supply. In between moves, the battery had fired on enemy positions, particularly round Arleux. The pace of the advance had slowed down, and First Army now carried out a limited operation (the Battle of Arleux, 28–29 April), with the battery bombarding wire and villages as the Canadians captured Arleux. For the next operation (the Third Battle of the Scarpe) the target shifted to Fresnoy, which the Canadians captured by a surprise predawn attack on 3 May, though the battle was called off next day, effectively closing the Arras offensive.

=== Messines ===
Battery HQ and RX pulled out on 12 May and moved north; LX followed on 21 May, and the battery reunited on 31 May at 'The Piggeries' in Ploegsteert ('Plug Street'), now under the command of 29th HAG in II ANZAC Corps. Second Army was gathering artillery for the Battle of Messines After preparing and camouflaging positions the battery began firing on enemy batteries and Messines village with observation aircraft. On 4 June the battery was heavily shelled, losing two killed, 14 gassed and five missing. The bombardment continued until the assault went in on 7 June, following the explosion of huge mines. II Anzac Corps had as its objective the southern end of the Messines–Wytschaete Ridge and Messines village. The results of the limited attack were spectacular, with the whole ridge being captured. 41st Siege Bty suffered a number of wounded, and over the following days of consolidation it was hit frequently, losing seven men killed, seven wounded or shellshocked, nine gassed and two missing. On 18 June it was ordered to pull out.

=== Ypres ===
29th HAG had handed its batteries over to 99th HAG on the evening of the Messines attack; now 41st Siege Bty left and went for rest at Vieux-Berquin. Between 2 and 4 July the sections broke camp and moved to join 23rd HAG at Woesten near Ypres, under XIV Corps. XIV Corps formed part of Fifth Army, which was preparing for the Third Ypres Offensive. The preliminary bombardment began on 6 June but was then postponed until the batteries' Second Echelons had arrived and they had improved their gun positions. 41st Siege Bty's Second Echelon arrived on 14 July. The bombardment was resumed on 15 July, the batteries firing an average of 800 rounds per day. The targets included enemy-held farms and woods, their strongpoints, dugouts and wire. Working with inexperienced Royal Flying Corps observers, the batteries found the results of the first few days unsatisfactory, but improved later. From 25 July the heavy guns participated in practice barrages. After delays caused by poor visibility, the offensive opened with the Battle of Pilckem Ridge on 31 July. 41st Siege Bty received one gun back from the workshop the night before, so was at full strength and fired 620 rounds on its tasks as part of XIV Corps' Left Bombardment Group. On the northern flank of the attack, XIV Corps' attack was successful, despite heavy casualties, with Guards and 38th (Welsh) Divisions advancing from their positions along the Yser Canal, pushing through Pilckem to their third objective and taking up a line along the Steenbeek stream. However, the attacks further south had been less successful, and during the afternoon heavy rain set in, flooding the Steenbeek. 41st Siege Bty had been ordered to move forward next morning, but this was cancelled because of the mud and it was not until 2 August that its first section struggled up the crowded roads to Boesinghe.

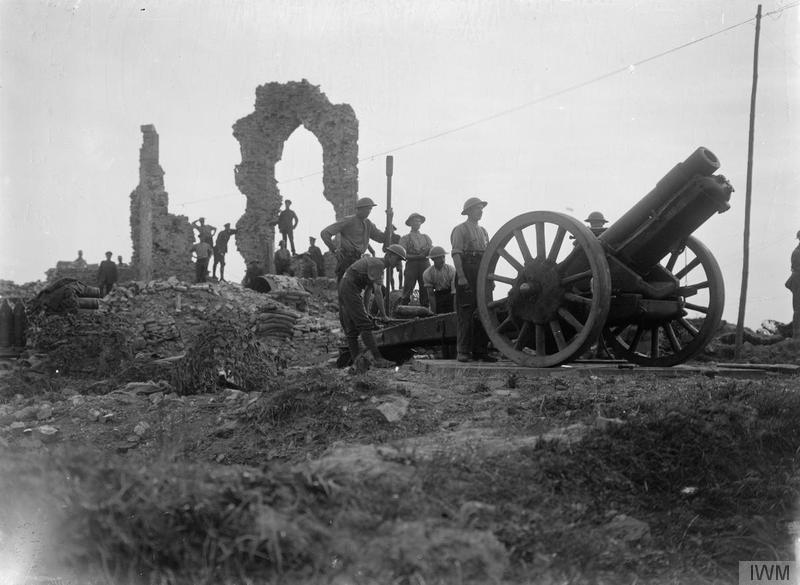
6-inch howitzer and crew during the Ypres offensive, 1917.

41st Siege Bty re-registered its guns on Langemarck Church and nearby trenches and continued the bombardment as the rest of the guns and ammunition came up. Resumption of the offensive on XIV Corps' front was delayed until 16 August (the Battle of Langemarck), when the infantry of 20th (Light) and 29th Divisions pushed out of the Steenbeek Valley to capture Langemarck itself, supported by the 6-inch howitzer batteries firing standing barrages on enemy strongpoints and 'searching' barrages between the objectives. This, however, was an isolated success on an otherwise unsuccessful day. Next day 62nd Siege Bty joined 23rd HAG and set up a joint OP with 41st Siege Bty. On 19 August the bombardment was renewed. On 21 August No 2 gun of 41st Siege Bty was destroyed when it suffered a 'premature', which also damaged No 1 gun; six men were wounded, two of whom remained on duty. The two guns were replaced on 24 August, but next day the new No 2 gun was damaged and No 4 buried by enemy fire, which also badly damaged the road. The batteries fired on 26–28 August in support of operations by the neighbouring corps, but almost no ground was gained. After the failures so far, Second Army took up the main direction of the offensive, and operations were paused for reorganisation.

For some time the policy had been to increase batteries to six guns where possible. Personnel for a third section of 41st Siege Bty joined from 416th Siege Bty on 28 August, but the additional guns did not arrive until November. 416th Siege Bty had been formed at Prees Heath Camp on 10 April 1917. After training the personnel went out to the Western Front on 20 August 1917 and joined XIV Corps. On arrival one section was posted to 11th Siege Bty, the other to 41st. The men of 41st Siege Bty spent two days at XIV Corps HA's Rest Camp, then returned to dig new gun pits in rear of the battered old ones. However, as soon as they moved the guns on the night of 11/12 September the whole of 23rd HAG was shelled with high explosive (HE) and gas.

The offensive was renewed on 20 September with the Battle of the Menin Road Ridge. The new tactics emphasised stepwise attacks, allowing time for the heavy artillery to carry out CB tasks and to destroy concrete emplacements. 23rd HAG began a 'hurricane' bombardment the day before and continued until 08.40 on Z day, by which time XIV Corps' right-hand division (20th (Light)) had carried out its limited operation. The guns then fired a protective barrage as the infantry consolidated their gains. 23rd HAG next began bombarding concrete dugouts and strongpoints along the Broehmbeek to prepare for the next advance. XIV Corps played a minor role in this attack (the Battle of Polygon Wood, 26 September), with 23rd HAG firing a protective 'weaving' barrage across the divisional front, 41st Siege Bty concentrating on Pascal Farm and its outbuildings. Major Trechmann went sick on 3 October and Capt H.M. Bennett took over command of the battery. The Battle of Broodseinde on 4 October saw XIV Corps gain its limited objectives with very little opposition. Next day 41st Siege Bty moved Nos 1 and 2 guns forward to a new position at 'Wood 16'. The Battle of Poelcappelle on 9 October went well for XIV Corps, but the worsening conditions led to failure further south. 41st Siege Bty got Nos 3 and 4 guns up to Wood 16 by light railway on 11 October but when the attack was renewed next day (the First Battle of Passchendaele) guns and ammunition across the front were sinking in the mud, bombardments were thin and inaccurate, and CB fire had almost ceased. 41st Siege Bty tried to get Nos 3 and 4 guns forward to 'Iron Cross Corner' on the Steenbeek, but 'both got hopelessly ditched in shell holes'. They were not ready for action until 25 October. 23rd HAG was ordered to lay on a 48-hour bombardment for the next attack (the Second Battle of Passchendaele on 26 October) from wherever the guns happened to be, but the infantry struggling through the mud failed to take their objectives.

=== Winter 1917–18 ===
When 41st Siege Bty's two new guns arrived on 4 November from the Ordnance Depot at Calais, they were taken by light railway and successfully emplaced at Iron Cross Corner, but XIV Corps HQ had been transferred to the Italian Front on 29 October, and 23rd HAG fell virtually silent while the new headquarters took over. The battery was transferred to 85th HAG on 7 November and the gunners spent from 14 November to 18 December at (what had been) XIV Corps' Training Area at Noordpeene while the guns were in the workshops.

41st Siege Bty then rejoined 23rd HAG at Noordschote in the northern part of the Ypres Salient on 20 December. By now HAG allocations were becoming more fixed, and during December 1917 they were converted into permanent RGA brigades once more. For the rest of the war the battery was in 23rd (9.2-inch Howitzer) Brigade, RGA, along with two other 6-inch howitzer batteries and one of 9.2-inch howitzers (the latter being 94th Siege Bty, also partly formed from Territorials from the 1st Durham RGA). On 6 January Acting-Maj Bennett, who had been OC of the battery, exchanged with Maj Reginald Fillingham, OC of 268th Siege Bty. Major Fillingham, aged 28, had joined the service as a boy soldier aged 14, had reached the rank of Staff-Sergeant and then been commissioned in March 1915; he had won a Military Cross (MC) in 1916.

From late December 1917 to the beginning of February 1918 41st Siege Bty and 23rd Bde were engaged in the normal routine of registration and short bombardments of hostile batteries and strongpoints. Then on 1 February the brigade was ordered south to reinforce Fifth Army. The personnel of 41st Siege Bty entrained at Poperinghe on 8 February while the lories went by road. The battery arrived at Roisel on 10 February, took over the guns and positions of 24th Siege Bty and fired its first CB shoot from these positions on 16 February. Two sections of the battery were in a forward position just north of Templeux-le-Guérard. 23rd Brigade initially came under Cavalry Corps, then XIX Corps moved in and took over the line. A German offensive was anticipated and counter-preparation shoots against likely enemy assembly positions were carried out each night. Meanwhile the batteries selected reserve positions to fall back to if the Germans broke through.

=== Spring Offensive ===
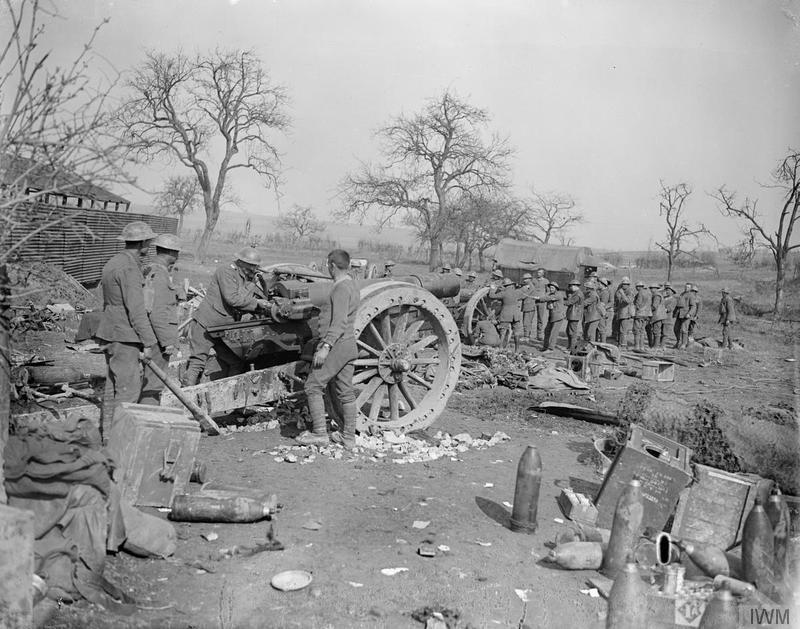
RGA gunners checking and positioning 6-inch howitzers in March 1918.

The expected German offensive (Operation Michael) opened at 04.30 on 21 March, and all the battery areas came under gas and HE shelling. Morning mist assisted the attackers and made visual signalling impossible, while telephone lines were cut by shellfire. However, in the absence of orders the batteries began firing on their pre-arranged targets. The Germans quickly overran XIX Corps' forward battalions (of 24th and 66th (2nd East Lancashire) Divisions), and by 08.00 were pushing troops down the valley north-east of Templeux. They outflanked the strong defences at the nearby quarries, which were evacuated, and they reached the village about 08.35. The three guns of 41st Siege Bty there were taken by surprise and the detachments came under rifle and machine gun fire. Major Fillingham evacuated his gunners and then went back to put the guns out of action and set fire to the cartridges while the Germans were only 200 yards (180 m) away. When the mist cleared about 11.30 the Germans could be seen streaming forward. 23rd Brigade was ordered to withdraw its guns to the prepared positions in the Brown Line; Fillingham got the two remaining guns of 41st Siege Bty's rear section away from in front of Roisel, even though the transport had not arrived and all the stores had to be abandoned. Major Fillingham was later awarded a Bar to his MC for his 'conspicuous gallantry and devotion to duty' that day.

That night 23rd Bde and its remaining guns were concentrated south of Roisel, behind XIX Corps' Battle Zone. But the Brown Line trenches were only half dug, and by 08.00 next morning the Germans had broken through and were only a few hundred yards from Roisel. 23rd Brigade was ordered to retire to the Green Line, but a lack of gun tractors meant that several guns had to be abandoned. 41st Siege Bty did get their two howitzers away hooked up behind transport lorries and came back into action by 14.00 behind Mons-en-Chaussée. At 19.00 23rd Bde was ordered to pull all its guns across the Somme Canal at the Brie bridge by dawn next morning. At 08.00 on 23 March 41st Siege Bty was in action, firing on the eastern approaches to the canal, where the bridges were being destroyed. In the afternoon it was ordered back further, but the roads were now completely choked with retreating troops and transport. 41st Siege Bty finally reached a position off the main road in front of Estrées, firing at the canal approaches. Next morning the Germans forced a crossing of the Somme and the brigade was ordered to retire further, but 41st Siege Bty was sent forward again that night, where XIX Corps intended to make a counter-attack against the German bridgeheads next morning. The attack never came off and the battery was withdrawn again in the afternoon, going back to Bayonvillers in the evening.

On 26 March (the Battle of Rosieres) the battery was in action all day in this position, firing on the Germans advancing through Foucaucourt: initial orders to retire were countermanded and the batteries instructed to remain until the last possible moment to cover the retreat. Some batteries pulled back when their ammunition ran out, but 41st Siege Bty continued firing until 16.00 on 27 March, when it withdrew to positions north of Villers-Bretonneux. Here a scratch force (Carey's Force) held the German advance until XIX Corps could organise a new line, and on 28–9 March the battery kept firing on the approaches to the town. Reinforcements were now arriving and the front stabilised. A final attack on the town on 4 April (the First Battle of Villers-Bretonneux) saw 23rd Bde's batteries firing continuously on one target after another, the FOOs reporting the Germans being 'mown down' by British artillery fire. They were withdrawn a short distance in the afternoon but the 6-inch howitzers were in action again late in the day as the attack was decisively repulsed by Australian troops. 41st Siege Bty was pushed forward again on 6 April to assist the Australians. The fighting died down on 13 April and 23rd Bde was sent for rest.

41st Siege Bty led the brigade's road column to Huppy, being held up when the coupling on one of its howitzers broke going up a steep hill, leaving the gun hanging precariously over the edge. At Huppy the batteries began refitting.

=== Summer 1918 ===
Having completed their refits, the batteries of 23rd Bde were ordered back into the line on 1 May. They pulled their guns into position at Longpré next day, 41st Siege Bty struggling to haul theirs uphill into the pits. One of the battery's sections was in a 'silent' position, not to open fire until required. May, June and July were spent in vigorous harassing and CB fire on German positions, aided by survey parties to aid calibration and observation by aircraft and balloons. The brigade was now under Australian Corps of Third Army. On 19 May the battery's two active sections supported an attack by 2nd Australian Division on Ville-sur-Ancre by suppressing an enemy battery, but had two officers and 35 ORs gassed that night. Two enemy 'Yellow Cross' (Mustard gas) shells had landed unnoticed to windward during the action, but luckily most of the cases were slight. The battery supported a more ambitious surprise attack by Australian Corps on Hamel on 4 July, firing large amounts of gas shells on CB tasks and HE on other targets. Shortly afterwards 23rd Bde passed to III Corps' Heavy Artillery with Fourth Army, involving a change of position for one of 41st Siege Bty's two active sections.

=== Hundred Days Offensive ===
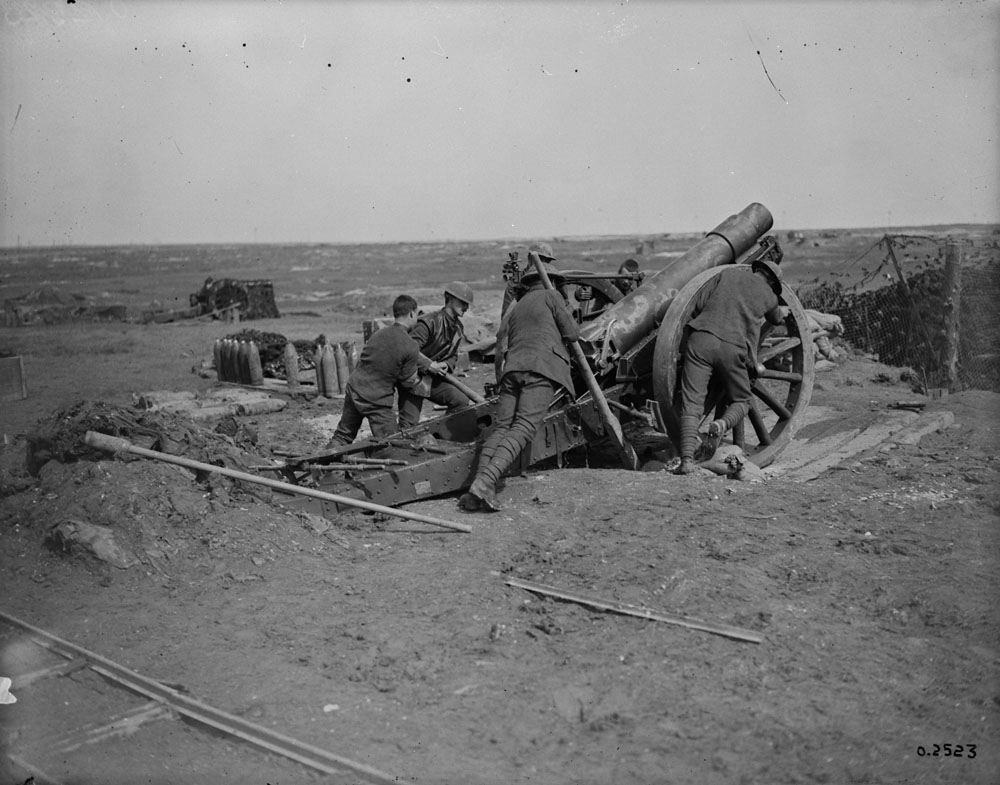
Crew positioning a 6-inch 26 cwt howitzer in 1918.

The Allies launched their counter-offensive at the Battle of Amiens on 8 August. III Corps' role was subsidiary, to form a flank guard to Fourth Army's main attack. Its guns were pushed well forward before the attack, with 23rd Bde moving its silent sections into the main battery positions. The attack was a resounding success, the CB fire being most effective on III Corps' front, and although that Corps had some harder fighting than others, the guns were moved up soon afterwards. III Corps followed up with a new attack on 22 August during the Battle of Albert, and 23rd Bde's 6-inch howitzer batteries continued following up the advance as the Second Battle of Bapaume followed on 31 August.

41st Siege Bty had been moving forward most days, but now the Germans were almost back on their Hindenburg Line defences. After Fourth Army had carried out the Battle of Épehy and the capture of Ronssoy (18 September), there was a pause to prepare operations to breach this line, while the batteries pounded the outposts. 23rd Brigade was assigned to Australian Corps (with II US Corps under command) for the attack on the Hindenburg Line. The bombardment began on 26 September after the batteries had taken up new positions. 41st Siege Bty had a section of Royal Australian Engineers attached to help it prepare roads and dugouts. The US troops had first to take some preliminary objectives before the main assault. Their attack on 'The Knoll' went in at 05.30 on 27 September, but they lost it to a counter-attack. There was not much hostile shelling, but Maj Fillingham was wounded in the stomach and died two days later.

That night 41st Siege Bty moved five guns (one was in the workshops) up to just 600 yards (550 m) behind the Allied front line to support the main attack. Zero for the Battle of the St Quentin Canal was 05.50 on 29 September. Despite some shortcomings, the Australian–US attack was a success, while the rest of Fourth Army had stormed across the canal. Over the following days the battery carried out harassing fire as the Australians pressed forward without any special heavy artillery bombardment until 3 October, when they attacked the Beaurevoir Line. For this attack 41st Siege Bty fired on enemy trenches and machine gun posts. Next day 23rd Bde came under XIII Corps for the attack on Prospect Hill, after which 41st Siege Bty pushed a section forward. On 5 October Maj Osborne arrived to take command of 41st Siege Bty. All the 6-inch howitzer batteries were ordered to find suitable positions for an attack on Serain. They were shelled on the road forward, but the attack was carried out successfully on 8 October and many French civilians were liberated. That evening all the 6-inch howitzers in the brigade were ordered to stand fast, and later told to rest and refit. Ammunition supply was becoming a problem over the damaged and crowded roads, and it took Fourth Army almost a week to gather enough for the next major operation, the assault crossing of the River Selle.

Zero for the Battle of the Selle was 05.20 on 17 October. The batteries kept up CB fire beforehand, then bombardment switched to important localities as the infantry (50th (Northumbrian) and 66th (2nd East Lancashire) Divisions) went over the top. Le Cateau was taken, but fighting went on all day and a second bombardment had to be arranged against the station and railway triangle. These objectives were not taken until another deliberate attack was put in on the morning of 18 October, after which the batteries were troubled by retaliatory enemy shelling. On 20 October 23rd Bde's 6-inch batteries assisted the attack across the Selle by the neighbouring V Corps and by the end of the day the engineers had constructed heavy bridges over the river. On 23 October XIII Corps attacked l'Evêque Wood, the 6-inch howitzers being used as the front of the creeping barrage, though concentrated on sunken roads, farms and strongpoints. 41st Siege Bty then pushed forward to Forest-en-Cambrésis, its FOO parties keeping in touch with the advancing infantry. It advanced again next day as Fourth Army closed up to the River Sambre.

There was another pause before the Battle of the Sambre was launched. 23rd Brigade had moved up to Bousies where 94th Siege Bty, leaving its slow-moving 9.2s behind, had taken over and were firing captured German guns, including a 'Five-Nine' howitzer. 41st Siege Bty now took over this gun and registered it with an observation aircraft before firing 60 rounds of 'Yellow Cross' into enemy batteries on 31 October. Zero for the Battle of the Sambre was 06.15 on 4 November; it proved to be the BEF's last set-piece attack. XIII Corps attacked across the Sambre Canal at Landrecies and through the Forêt de Mormal, which surprised the Germans. In the days leading up to the attack 23rd Bde had fired 'crash' barrages on hostile batteries, and the German artillery's response to the attack was described as 'very feeble'. Afterwards there was little opposition, and the heavy batteries were left behind as the pursuit accelerated. On 7 November 23 Bde was ordered into rest billets at Elincourt, and was still there when the Armistice with Germany came into force on 11 November.

The Commonwealth War Graves Commission lists 48 men of the battery who died during the war, including Maj Reginald Fillingham who was buried at Doingt Communal Cemetery Extension outside Péronne.

== Postwar ==
23rd Brigade moved up to Hecq and in December to Solre-sur-Sambre, where its batteries were billeted for the winter. Demobilisation began in January 1919. In February the brigade was selected to go to Germany to form part of the Army of Occupation, but it went without its howitzer batteries, which remained in Belgium prior to returning to the UK.

From 24 July 1919 41st Siege Bty became 41st Battery in XV Brigade, RGA, in the postwar Regular army, but it was absorbed into 58th Bty on 31 January 1920.
