= Authieule =

- Commune
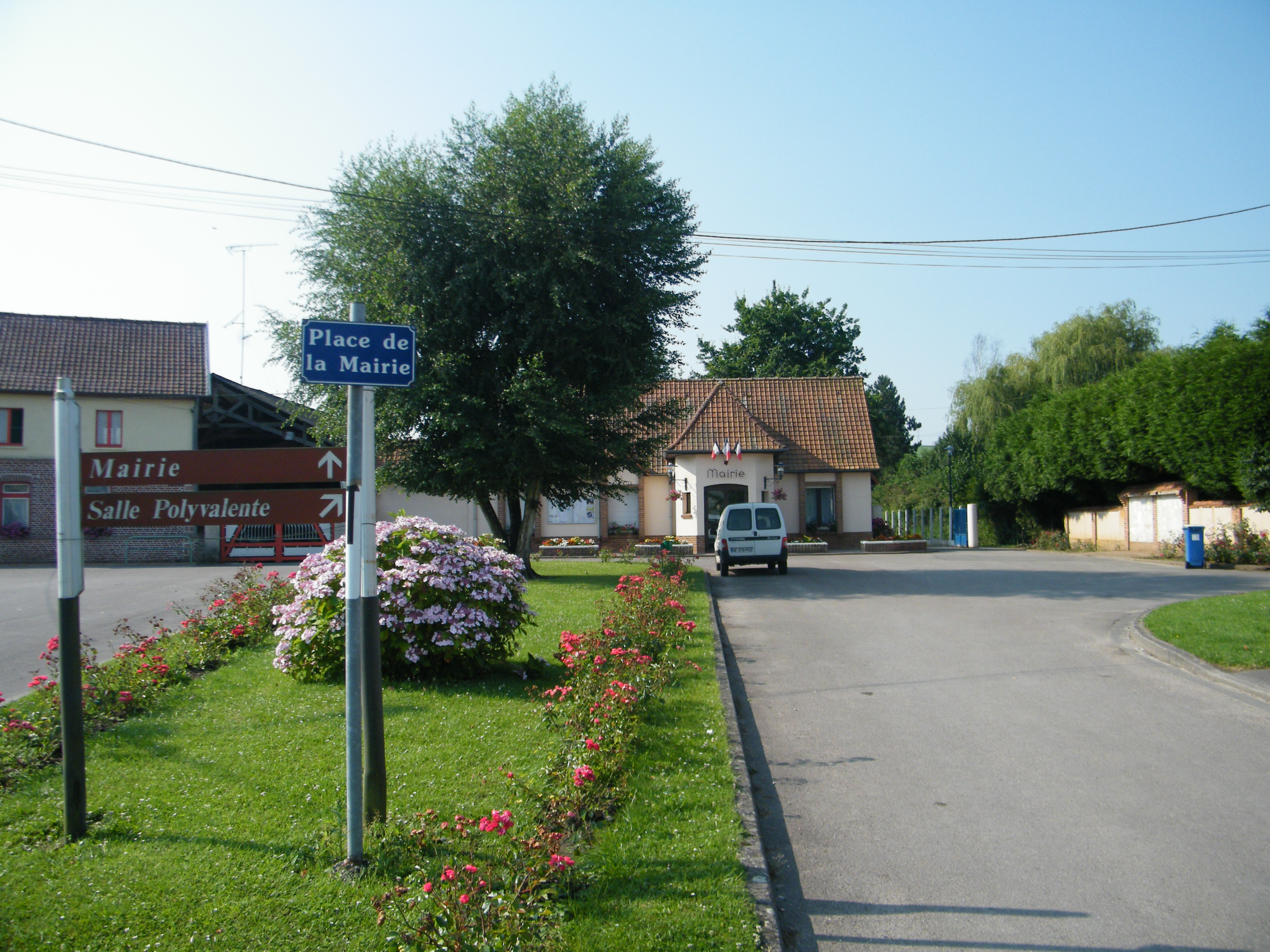
- The town hall of Authieule

- Coat of arms
- Location of Authieule
- Location within France Location within Hauts-de-France
- Coordinates: 50°08′40″N 2°22′18″E
- Country: France
- Region: Hauts-de-France
- Department: Somme
- Arrondissement: Amiens
- Canton: Doullens
- Intercommunality: CC Territoire Nord Picardie

Government
  - Mayor (2024–2026): Frédéric Legault
- Area^{1}: 4.58 km^{2} (1.77 sq mi)
- Elevation: 92 m (302 ft)
- Highest elevation: 142 m (466 ft)
- Lowest elevation: 57 m (187 ft)
- Population (2023): 393
  - Density: 85.8/km^{2} (222/sq mi)
- Time zone: UTC+01:00 (CET)
  - Summer (DST): UTC+02:00 (CEST)
- INSEE/Postal code: 80044 /80600
- ^{1} French Land Register data, which excludes lakes, ponds, glaciers > 1 km^{2} (0.386 sq mi or 247 acres) and river estuaries.

Authieule (French pronunciation: [otjœl]; Picard: Eutieule) is a commune in the Somme department in Hauts-de-France in northern France.

== See also ==
- Communes of the Somme department
