= Woesten =

- Deelgemeente
- Woesten (in Dutch)
- Coordinates: 50°54′N 2°47′E
- Country: Belgium
- Province: West Flanders
- Municipality: Vleteren

Area
  - Total: 6.27 km^{2} (2.42 sq mi)

Population (2005)
  - Total: 1,385
  - Density: 221/km^{2} (570/sq mi)
- Source: NIS
- Postal code: 8640
- Area code: 057
- Website: www.vleteren.be

Woesten is a rural Belgian village in the Vleteren municipality of West Flanders province. The town is close to the city of Ypres. The centre of the city is located on a road junction of the N8 between Ypres and Veurne and the Poperingestraat to Poperinge.

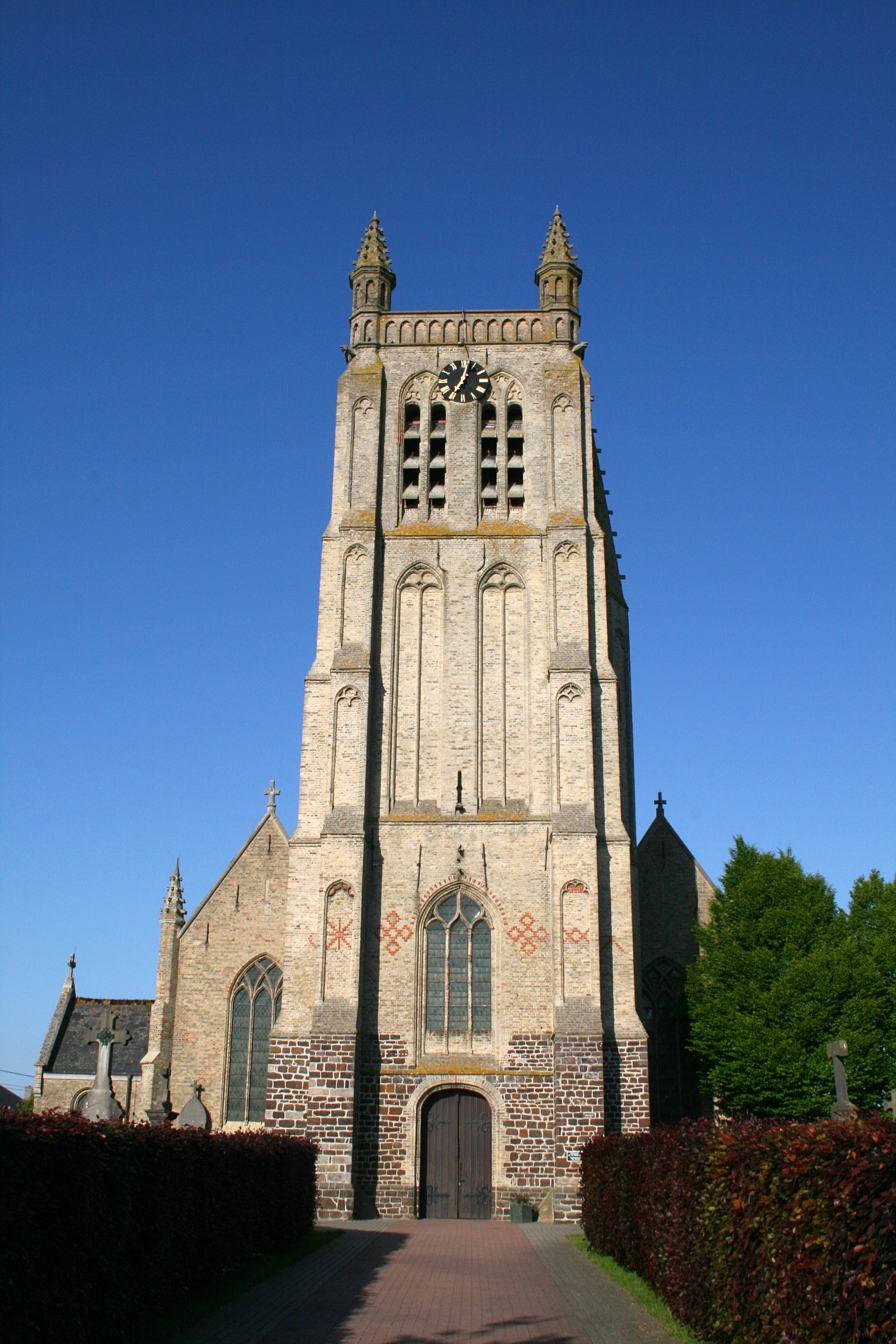
De Sint-Rectrudiskerk - Toren van de 15de eeuw.

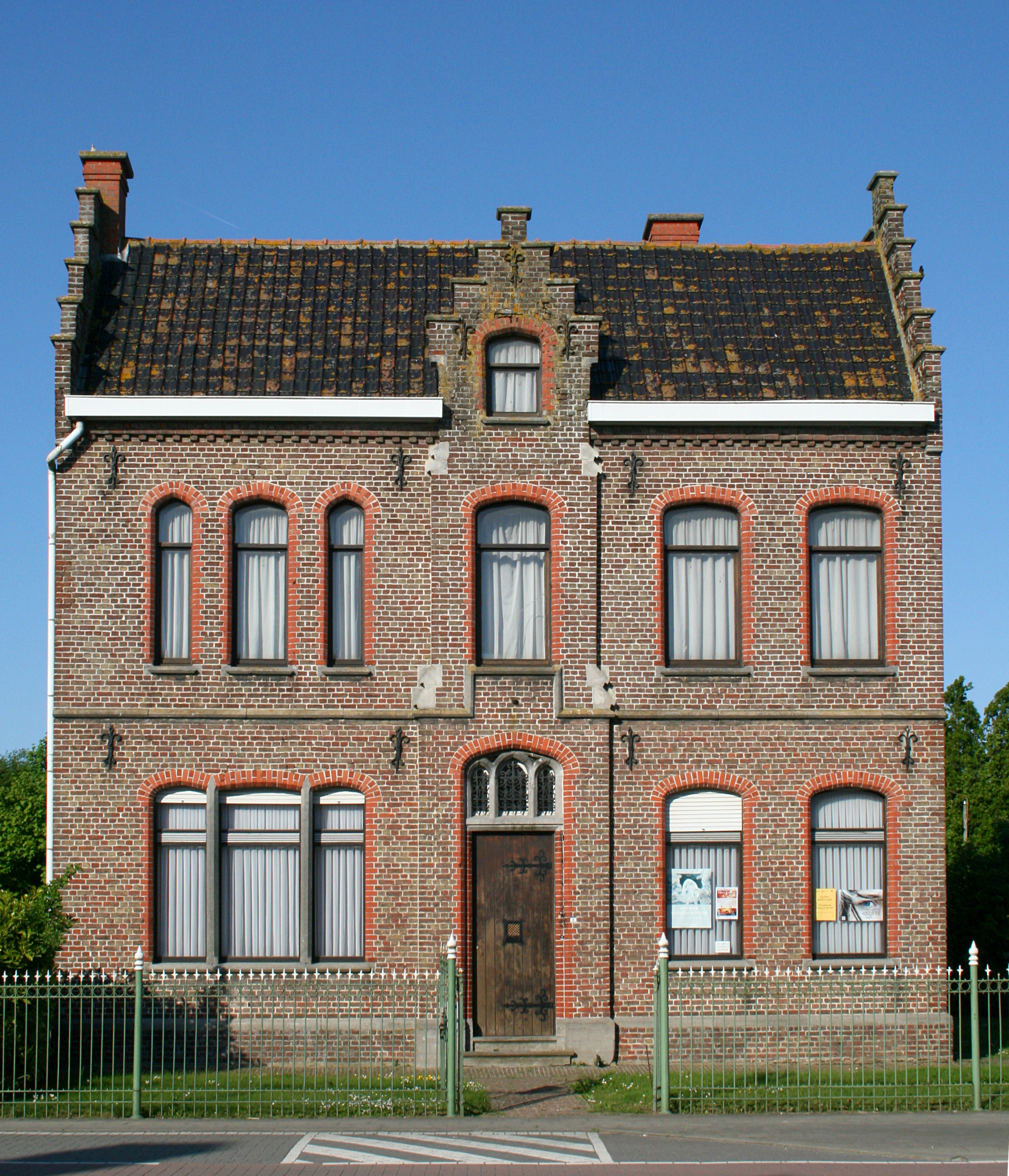
The presbytery.

== History ==
The name Woesten comes from "Wastina", meaning "deserted sprawl". In the 12th century, the village was mentioned as "solitudo renyngensis", meaning the "deserted sprawl of Reninge". The name "Wastina" was first mentioned in the 13th century.

== Landmarks ==
The parish and church are named after Saint-Rictrude. The Gothic church of Saint-Rictrude dates from the 15th century. The church was destroyed during World War I, but was rebuilt in 1922/23.

Until 1916, there was a brewery (built in 1850) where the marketplace is now. The brewery belonged to the Seynhaeve-family, later the Florimond Van Neste-family and eventually the Decaestekere-family. During World War I, the brewery was destroyed; it was later rebuilt a couple hundred meters away. On the marketplace, there's still an old water pump that used to belong to the brewery.
