= Defence Medal (United Kingdom) =

United Kingdom military campaign medal for service in the Second World War

The Defence Medal
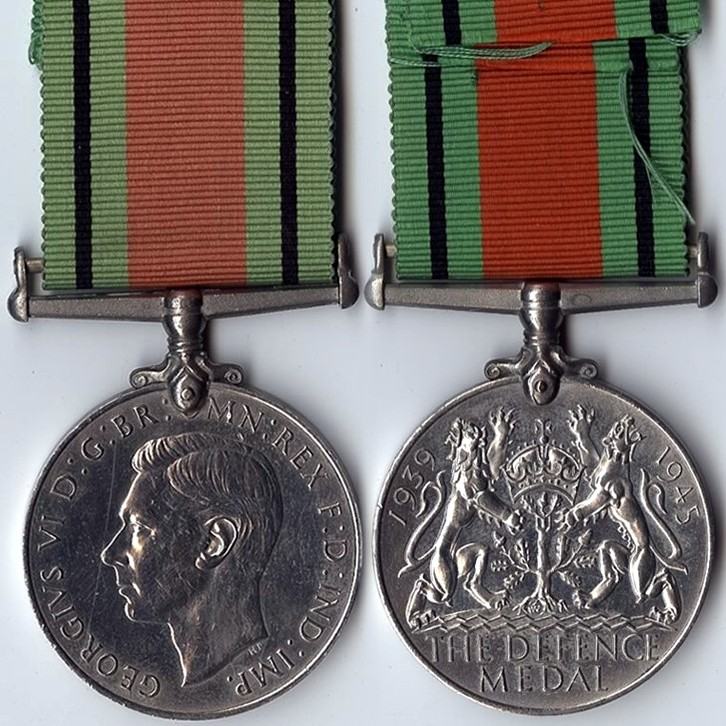
- Type: Campaign medal
- Awarded for: 3 years, 360, 180 or 90 days, depending on area and nature of service
- Country: United Kingdom
- Presented by: the Monarch of the United Kingdom and the Dominions of the British Commonwealth, and Emperor of India
- Eligibility: Military and certain civilian service
- Campaign: Second World War
- Established: May 1945
- Ribbon bar

Order of wear
- Next (higher): France and Germany Star
- Next (lower): War Medal

The Defence Medal is a campaign medal instituted by the United Kingdom in May 1945, to be awarded to citizens of the British Commonwealth for both non-operational military and certain types of civilian war service during the Second World War.

== Institution ==
The duration of the Second World War in Europe was from 1 September 1939 to 8 May 1945, while in the Pacific Theatre it continued until 2 September 1945. The Defence Medal was instituted by the United Kingdom in May 1945, to be awarded to British military and civilian personnel for a range of services in the United Kingdom, and to Commonwealth and British Colonial personnel who served from or outside their home countries in a non-operational area or in an area subject to threat, such as attacks from the air.

== Award criteria ==
The Defence Medal was awarded for non-operational service in the Armed Forces, the Home Guard, the Civil Defence Service and other approved civilian services during the period from 3 September 1939 to 8 May 1945 (2 September 1945 for those serving in certain specified territories in the Far East and the Pacific), with an earlier end date for members of organisations that stood-down before May 1945.

=== Military personnel ===
In the United Kingdom, those eligible included military personnel working in headquarters, on training bases and airfields for the duration of the War in Europe from 3 September 1939 to 8 May 1945, and service by members of the Home Guard during its existence from 14 May 1940 to 31 December 1944. The medal was also awarded for non-operational service overseas in the Dominions of the Commonwealth and in British Colonies.

Those who qualified for one or more Campaign Star could also be awarded the Defence Medal.

=== Civilian services ===
Eligible civilian service in the United Kingdom included, but was not confined to, civilian services whose members were eligible for Chevrons for war service.

- Civil Defence services established by a Government Department or Local Authority.
  - Wardens Service, including Shelter Wardens.
  - Rescue Service, including former First-Aid Party Service.
  - Decontamination Service.
  - Report and Control Service.
  - Messenger Service.
  - Ambulance Service. including Sitting Case Cars.
  - First-Aid Service, including First-Aid Posts and Points, Public Cleansing Centres, Mobile Cleansing Units and the Nursing Service for public air-raid shelters.
- Local Authority Civil Defence Services.
  - Rest Centre Service.
  - Emergency Food Service, including the Queen's Messenger Convoy Service.
  - Canteen Service.
  - Emergency Information Service.
  - Mortuary Service.
- National Fire Service, including service in a local authority Fire Brigade or the Auxiliary Fire Service prior to nationalisation.
- The Police including Special Constabulary (with 3 years service), Royal Marine Police Special Reserve, Admiralty Civil Police, War Department Constabulary, Air Ministry Constabulary, Railway Police and Dock Police.
- American Ambulance, Great Britain.
- Civil Air Transport.
- Civil Defence Reserve, Kent County Civil Defence Mobile Reserve and West Sussex County Civil Defence Mobile Reserve.
- Civil Nursing Reserve.
- Civilian Technical Corps.
- HM Coastguard.
- Fire Guards who performed duties under the local authorities, or at Government or business premises.
- Lighthouse keepers who served under the three Lighthouse Authorities and keepers of Light-Vessels under those authorities, who did not qualify for the 1939–1945 Star.
- Nurses in hospitals for which Government Departments or Local Authorities were responsible, or in the recognised voluntary hospitals.
- Port of London Authority River Emergency Service.
- Clyde River Patrol.
- Royal Observer Corps.
- Women's Voluntary Services for Civil Defence, whose members could qualify provided they:
  - were enrolled in an eligible local authority Civil Defence Service;
  - performed duties analogous to those of one of the eligible local authority Civil Defence Services, and the section of the Women's Voluntary Services to which they belonged was one which functioned operationally during or immediately after enemy attacks.

=== Qualifying service ===
The length of qualifying service required for the award of the Defence Medal varied, depending on where and in what role an individual served.

- For persons normally resident in the United Kingdom, the requirement was 1,080 days (three years) of service in the United Kingdom or 90 days (three months) of service in a Mine and Bomb Disposal Unit. The qualifying period in the United Kingdom ended upon the end of the War in Europe on 8 May 1945.
- In a non-operational area, not subjected to air attack and not closely threatened, the requirement was 360 days (one year) of service overseas from or outside the individual's country of residence. Military service in certain areas overseas from the United Kingdom could qualify up to 2 September 1945, when the war in the Pacific ended. Service was reckonable from the date of embarkation and was counted at its full rate for the voyage to the non-operational area.
- In a non-operational area subjected to air attack or closely threatened, the requirement was 180 days (six months) of service overseas from or outside a person's country of residence. The same applied to British Commonwealth citizens from overseas who served in the Home Guard in the United Kingdom. Service was reckonable from the date of embarkation and, for the voyage to the area of service, was counted at half the actual duration of the voyage.

The medal was usually awarded to Canadians for six months service in Britain between 3 September 1939 and 8 May 1945.

Service by Indian Army personnel in India did not count as qualifying service for the Defence Medal, since such service qualified for the India Service Medal, awarded to members of the Indian Armed Forces instead of the Defence Medal for three years of non-operational service in India.

==== Country of residence ====
Regarding service outside the country of residence, five territories were classified as single contiguous areas. Movements by personnel from one territory to another within the defined groups were not regarded as "outside the country of residence" in terms of qualification for the award of the Defence Medal.

- Great Britain, Northern Ireland, Eire, Isle of Man and the Channel Islands, including all the islands adjacent to Great Britain.
- Cyprus, Syria, Lebanon, Palestine, Egypt and Transjordan.
- Kenya, Tanganyika, Uganda, Nyasaland, Northern Rhodesia and Zanzibar.
- Nigeria, Gambia, Sierra Leone and the Gold Coast.
- The Union of South Africa, South-West Africa, Basutoland, Swaziland and the Bechuanaland Protectorate.

==== Threatened territories ====
The following territories were classified as non-operational areas subjected to enemy air attacks or closely threatened during the periods as shown:

Europe

- United Kingdom from 3 September 1939 to 8 May 1945.

Mediterranean Area

- Anglo-Egyptian Sudan from 28 November 1941 to 8 May 1945.
- Corsica from 5 October 1943 to 8 May 1945.
- Cyprus from 3 September 1939 to 8 May 1945.
- Egypt from 13 May 1943 to 8 May 1945.
- Gibraltar from 3 September 1939 to 8 May 1945.
- Malta from 13 May 1943 to 8 May 1945.
- North Africa from 13 May 1943 to 8 May 1945.
- Palestine from 3 September 1939 to 8 May 1945.
- Pantellaria from 12 June 1943 to 8 May 1945.
- Sardinia from 20 September 1943 to 8 May 1945.
- Sicily from 18 August 1943 to 8 May 1945.
- Sinai from 3 September 1939 to 8 May 1945.
- Syria and Lebanon from 12 July 1941 to 8 May 1945.

Indian Ocean

- Aden from 3 September 1939 to 8 May 1945.
- Andaman Islands from 3 September 1939 to 22 March 1942.
- Bengal and Assam, west of the Brahmaputra, from 1 January 1944 to 2 September 1945.
- Ceylon from 3 September 1939 to 8 May 1945.
- Cocos/Keeling Islands from 3 September 1939 to 8 May 1945.
- Iraq from 1 June 1941 to 8 May 1945.
- Maldive Islands from 3 September 1939 to 8 May 1945.
- Mauritius from 3 September 1939 to 8 May 1945.
- Nicobar Islands from 3 September 1939 to 22 March 1942.
- Persia from 29 August 1941 to 8 May 1945.
- Rodriquez Island from 3 September 1939 to 2 September 1945.
- Seychelles from 3 September 1939 to 8 May 1945.

Pacific Area

- British North Borneo from 3 September 1939 to 30 December 1941.
- Brunei from 3 September 1939 to 7 December 1941.
- Christmas Island from 3 September 1939 to 2 September 1945.
- Cook Islands from 3 September 1939 to 2 September 1945.
- Fanning Island from 3 September 1939 to 2 September 1945.
- Fiji Islands from 3 September 1939 to 2 September 1945.
- Hong-Kong from 3 September 1939 to 7 December 1941.
- Malaya from 3 September 1939 to 7 December 1941.
- New Caledonia from 3 September 1939 to 2 September 1945.
- New Hebrides from 3 September 1939 to 2 September 1945.
- Norfolk Island from 3 September 1939 to 2 September 1945.
- Northern Territory of Australia, north of latitude 14°30' South, from 3 September 1939 to 2 September 1945.
- Phoenix Islands from 3 September 1939 to 2 September 1945.
- Rarotonga Island from 3 September 1939 to 2 September 1945.
- Sarawak from 3 September 1939 to 7 December 1941.
- Tonga Island from 3 September 1939 to 2 September 1945.
- Torres Strait Islands from 3 September 1939 to 2 September 1945.
- Union Island from 3 September 1939 to 2 September 1945.
- Washington Island from 3 September 1939 to 2 September 1945.
- Western Samoa from 3 September 1939 to 2 September 1945.

West Atlantic

- Falkland Islands from 3 September 1939 to 8 May 1945.

=== Special criteria ===
The Defence Medal was awarded without regard to the required period of service to those:

- in eligible categories, whose service was brought to an end by death due to enemy action while on duty or by injuries which entitled them to a Wound Stripe;
- who received an award for bravery, including a King's Commendation for Brave Conduct or a King's Commendation for Valuable Service in the Air, provided that the award was earned while performing service qualifying for the Defence Medal;
- recipients of the George Cross or the George Medal, even when not rendering service which would qualify them for the Defence Medal at the time the award was earned.

== Description ==
The Defence Medal is a disk, 36 millimetres (1.42 inches) in diameter. The non-swivelling straight bar suspender is attached to the medal with a single-toe claw mount and a pin through the upper edge of the medal. The British issue medals were struck in cupro-nickel, while those awarded in Canada were struck in silver.

Obverse

The obverse, designed by Humphrey Paget, shows the bareheaded effigy of King George VI, facing left. Around the perimeter is the legend "GEORGIVS VI D:G:BR:OMN:REX F:D:IND:IMP." (George 6th, by the grace of God, King of all the Britains, Defender of the Faith, Emperor of India).

Reverse

The reverse, designed by Harold Parker, shows the Royal Crown resting on an oak sapling, flanked by a lion and a lioness above stylised waves. At the top left is the year "1939" and at the top right the year "1945". The exergue has the words "THE DEFENCE MEDAL" in two lines.

Naming

The British House of Commons decided that Second World War campaign medals awarded to British forces would be issued unnamed. Medals awarded to Australians, Indians and South Africans were impressed with the recipient's name and details.

Ribbon

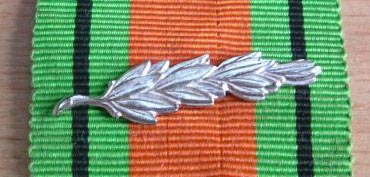
Emblem denoting a King's Commendation for Brave Conduct

The ribbon is 32 millimetres wide, with a 4½ millimetres wide green band, a 1 millimetre wide black band and a 4½ millimetres wide green band, repeated and separated by a 12 millimetres wide orange band. The flame-coloured orange centre band and the green bands symbolise enemy attacks on Britain's green and pleasant land while the narrow black bands represent the black-outs against air attacks.

Recipients of a King's Commendation for Brave Conduct, earned while performing service qualifying for the Defence Medal, wore an emblem of silver laurel leaves on the medal ribbon.

The ribbon for the Defence Medal and those of the Second World War Campaign Stars, with the exception of the Arctic Star, were rumoured to have been devised by King George VI. The proposals were designed by Peter O’Brien (1900-1977), and approved by the King.

== Order of wear ==
The order of wear of the Second World War campaign stars was determined by their respective campaign start dates and by the campaign's duration. This is the order worn, even when a recipient qualified for them in a different order. The Defence Medal and War Medal are worn after the stars. The Canadian Volunteer Service Medal was worn after the Defence Medal and before the War Medal, with other Commonwealth war medals worn after the War Medal.

- The 1939–1945 Star, from 3 September 1939 to 2 September 1945, the full duration of the Second World War.
- The Atlantic Star, from 3 September 1939 to 8 May 1945, the duration of the Battle of the Atlantic and the War in Europe.
- The Arctic Star, from 3 September 1939 to 8 May 1945, the duration of the Arctic Convoys and the War in Europe.
- The Air Crew Europe Star, from 3 September 1939 to 5 June 1944, the period until D-Day minus one.
- The Africa Star, from 10 June 1940 to 12 May 1943, the duration of the North African Campaign.
- The Pacific Star, from 8 December 1941 to 2 September 1945, the duration of the Pacific War.
- The Burma Star, from 11 December 1941 to 2 September 1945, the duration of the Burma Campaign.
- The Italy Star, from 11 June 1943 to 8 May 1945, the duration of the Italian Campaign.
- The France and Germany Star, from 6 June 1944 to 8 May 1945, the duration of the North-West Europe Campaign.
- The Defence Medal, from 3 September 1939 to 8 May 1945 (2 September 1945 for those serving in the Far East and the Pacific), the duration of the Second World War.
- The War Medal, from 3 September 1939 to 2 September 1945, the full duration of the Second World War.

The Defence Medal is therefore worn as shown:

- Preceded by the France and Germany Star.
- Succeeded by the War Medal 1939–1945.
