= Hadfield-Spears Ambulance Unit =

The Hadfield-Spears Ambulance Unit was an Anglo-French volunteer medical unit which served initially with the 4th French army in Lorraine, eastern France, during the Second World War from February 1940 until it was forced to retreat on 9 June ahead of the German advance. Its official French designation at that time was Ambulance Chirurgical Légère de Corps d'Armée 282. The unit made its way across France via Bordeaux to Arcachon from where it was evacuated back to Britain, arriving at Plymouth on 26 June. The unit re-grouped and re-equipped in Britain before sailing on 20 March 1941 for the Middle East, landing at Suez on 2 May. Under the designation of HCM (Hôpital chirurgical mobile) 3 Ambulance Hadfield-Spears, it was attached to the Free French forces (1st Free French Division) in the Middle East, North Africa, Italy and France before being dissolved in Paris in June 1945 on the order of General Charles de Gaulle.

== Origin and leadership ==
=== Sponsor ===
The unit was established during the Phoney War with £100,000 donated by Sir Robert Hadfield, the British steel tycoon. He had entrusted the money to his wife, Lady Frances Belt Hadfield, asking that she find a suitable good cause. Lady Hadfield, a francophile like her husband, spent most of the year at their villa at Cap Ferrat in the south of France. She explained to the French Consulate in London that 'the gift was the repayment of a debt she owed to France for the happiest years of her life'. In the First World War, this well-connected American from Philadelphia had been one of the first to start a Red Cross hospital for the treatment of wounded and sick servicemen. This hospital at Wimereux, near Boulogne-sur-Mer, was run entirely at her own expense. Lady Hadfield, CBE, died in London on 6 November 1949.

=== Mary 'May' Borden ===
At the start of the Second World War, Lady Hadfield was 77 and no longer able to run a field hospital. Accordingly she turned to another American – her friend, the novelist Mary Borden, who was known to her friends and family as 'May'. The latter had, at her own expense, also set up a hospital for the French army in July 1915 (l'Hôpital Chirugical Mobile No 1); now she wanted to help during the new conflict. Mary had close ties with France – it was while her unit was on the Somme in 1916 that she met Captain Edward Louis Spears, a British liaison officer attached to the French army. He was subsequently promoted to a General Staff Officer 1st Grade, liaising between the French Ministry of War and the War Office in London. They were married in 1918 and living in Paris at the end of the war. Spears later became a Member of Parliament; his pro-French views in the Commons earning him the nickname of 'the Member for Paris'. They had a wide circle of influential friends, both British and French, whom they entertained at their London home during the inter-war period. Mary Borden (Mrs Spears) agreed to be in charge of the (largely British) female personnel – the nurses and drivers of Lady Hadfield's new field hospital with its 100 beds. Mary Spears was generally known as 'Madame la Générale' by the French – a reference to her husband's rank in the British army. The French military 'Service de Santé' agreed to provide the male staff for the medical unit, including doctors, orderlies and drivers for the unit's heavy trucks.

== Active service in Lorraine ==
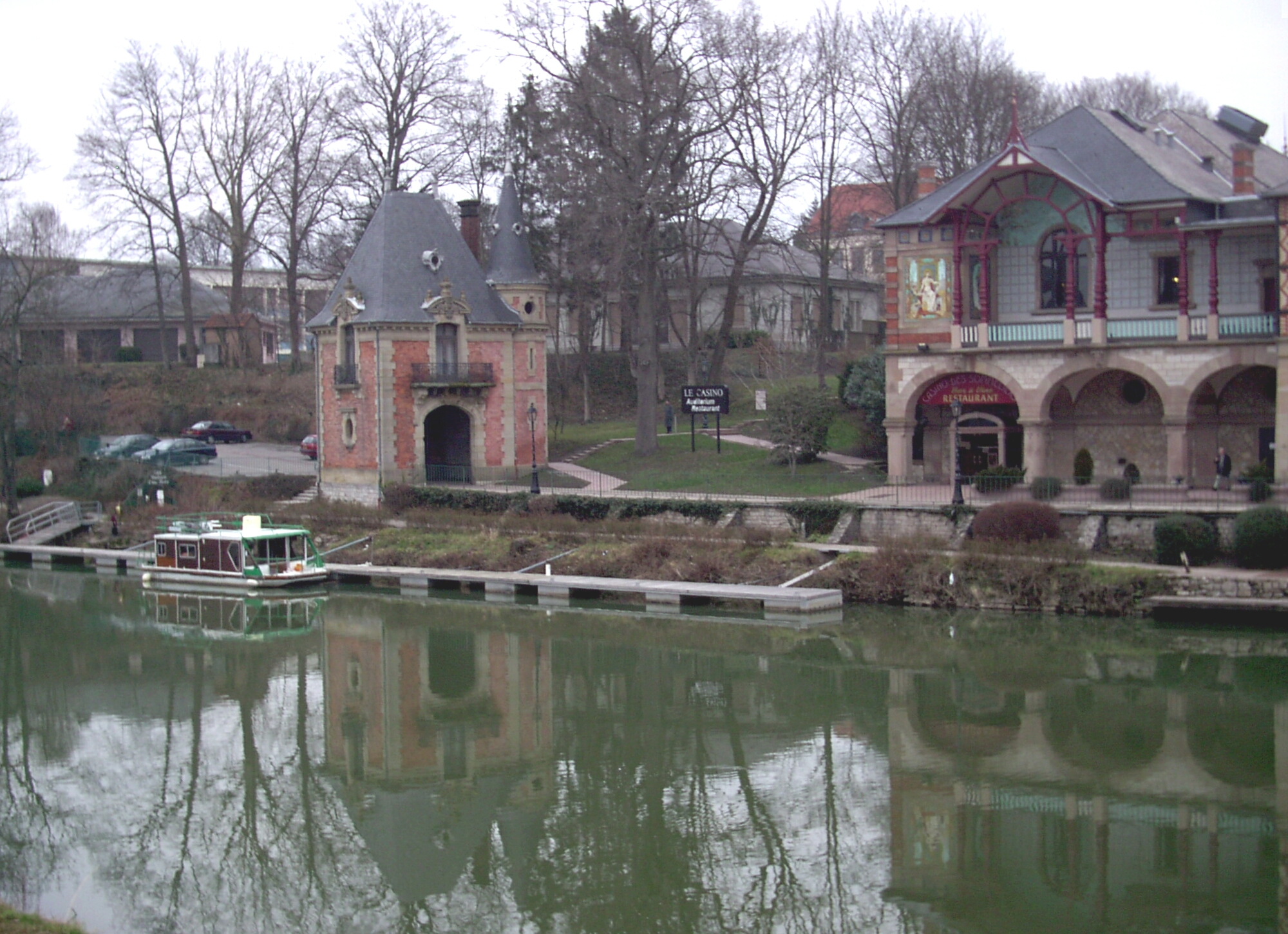
The river Sarre at Sarreguemines – the front line. The town had been abandoned by its French inhabitants. Girls of the Hadfield-Spears unit went for crockery from the china factory. They peered across to the German bank. 'We could see what appeared to be a deserted café. The windows were wide open, the deep grass in front had grown up through the iron tables and chairs.'

Complete with tents, X-ray equipment, sterilizing apparatus, surgical instruments, beds, bedding, linen and ward equipment, the Hadfield-Spears mobile hospital left Paris in February 1940 for the village of St Jean le Bassel, near the front line in Lorraine. The medical officer in charge was Le Médecin Capitaine Jean Gosset – under him were three young French surgeons, a radiographer and administrative staff. There were 12 French drivers for the heavy trucks and 50 private soldiers. The British girls consisted of ten nurses, and 15 drivers of the Mechanised Transport Corps (MTC). Lady Hadfield had donated a Renault limousine for the use of Mrs Spears.

The Hadfield-Spears unit was attached to the French 4th Army, which was commanded by Général Réquin, a former World War 1 comrade of General Spears. At St Jean le Bassel, they were billeted partly at a convent and partly in the village itself. Their predecessors had left the wards in poor condition and they spent two weeks getting the place into shape before moving patients to their new quarters.

There was little military activity in the sector – even when the Germans launched their attack on the Netherlands, Luxembourg and Belgium on 10 May. The girls had a peaceful time in the French countryside, making sorties up to the front line at Sarreguemines, which had become a ghost town since its French inhabitants were evacuated nine months previously. Lady Hadfield travelled up from the south of France to visit her unit – Mary Spears would not see her again until the end of the war. On 20 May, the news came through that her husband had been promoted to Major General, although she did not then know that he had been appointed Churchill's personal representative to the French Prime Minister, Paul Reynaud.

On 28 May, they heard that the Belgian army was surrendering. General Réquin spoke to Mrs Spears and emphasised the serious of the military situation. She received telephone calls from Paris – her husband wanted her to come to Paris before he flew to London. She resisted – how could she leave her unit at a time like this? Spears was insistent but she was reluctant, as was Captain Gosset, who feared the road might be cut and that she would be unable to get back. They heard that Dunkirk had been evacuated. Then Spears rang again – this time ordering her to come to Paris. She decided to make a dash to the capital and back. They met at the British embassy. With the French army collapsing on all fronts, Spears was exhausted. 'His eyes were bloodshot. There were lines inches deep in his face. [...] I saw for one second what was going to happen. The war leapt at me out of his eyes. I was terrified'.

That evening a call came from her unit in Lorraine – they had received orders to move to another location the following day. She realised it had been most unwise to become separated from her girls. Then her driver reported that she had wrecked their car in the blackout. Fortunately, General Spears managed to procure another car with two French military drivers; Mary Spears and her MTC driver left the following morning. They arrived back at St Jean le Bassel just as the mobile hospital was about to move off.

== Retreat ==
Over the next 12 days, the unit made its way first west, and then southwest across France. Initially they kept in touch with the French 4th army, hoping to set up their hospital and carry out the humanitarian task which had brought them. But this was not to be. The pace of the French collapse quickened; they were never more than two nights in any one place. It was only at Châlons-sur-Marne that a party of six French orderlies and a French nurse was briefly detached to a hospital to help its overwhelmed medical staff. The roads were choked with refugees, petrol was hard to find and they went off the edge of their road maps. While queuing to refuel at the barracks in Gannat, between Moulins and Clermont-Ferrand, they heard that Marshal Philippe Pétain had asked the Germans for an armistice.

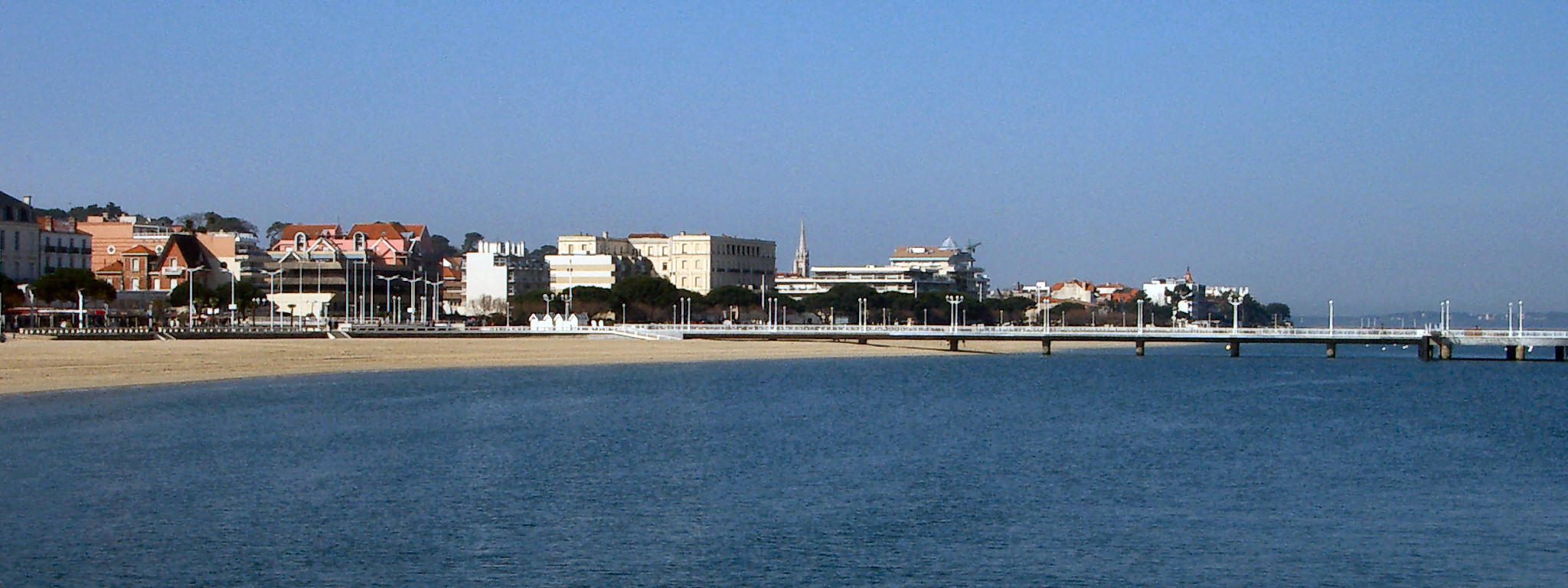
The beach at Arcachon in southwestern France. After their arduous trek ahead of the German advance, girls of the Hadfield-Spears unit relaxed among French holidaymakers on these sands before transferring to a British warship. Their evacuation from Arcachon was supervised by Lieutenant Ian Fleming of the Royal Navy.

It was no longer a matter of retreat – more of escape. Their destination was Bordeaux, which had been the final seat of the French government before its ultimate collapse; they knew that Mary's husband, General Spears, had been here with the French government and they were sure he would help them find a way back to Britain. At Brives, their commanding officer, le Médecin Capitaine Jean Gosset, managed to send a telegram to warn the British Embassy at Bordeaux that the unit was splitting up, and that the 26 women would be continuing alone. All Lady Hadfield's medical equipment and stores were abandoned at the roadside. It is against Red Cross regulations for surgical or medical stores to be destroyed, but it is not known whether they were subsequently seized by the Germans. The women set off in six cars for Bordeaux.

The British military attaché in Bordeaux directed them to Arcachon where, at a villa outside the town, they met a British naval lieutenant, Ian Fleming, who arranged for them to be taken aboard HMS Galatea (71) for the short sea voyage to St Jean de Luz near the Spanish frontier. Here they were transhipped to a passenger vessel, the Etric [sic], which already had on board a large number of British subjects (mainly well-to-do ladies and their staff) evacuated from their villas in France. Mary Spears and her party of 25 British nurses and MTC drivers docked in Plymouth on 26 June 1940 with nothing but their personal effects.

== Re-grouping and re-equipping in Britain ==
Mary Spears wished to continue with her work, and had the support of some of her original volunteer nurses and MTC drivers. Sir Robert Hadfield was dying at a country house near Epsom; Lady Hadfield was cut off at her villa in the south of France. There was accordingly no question of more help from the original sponsors but, through her contacts in America, she tapped into funds which had been donated in America by a charitable organisation known as the British War Relief Society, whose initial donation of £25,000 was enough for her to consider that their financial worries were over. The name of the new unit would remain unchanged, but its organisation and Anglo-French character would be identical to that of her two previous hospitals. These conditions – including the proviso that Mrs Spears would exercise complete control over the female personnel – were accepted in writing by General Charles de Gaulle, who was by now leading the Free French Forces from his headquarters in London.

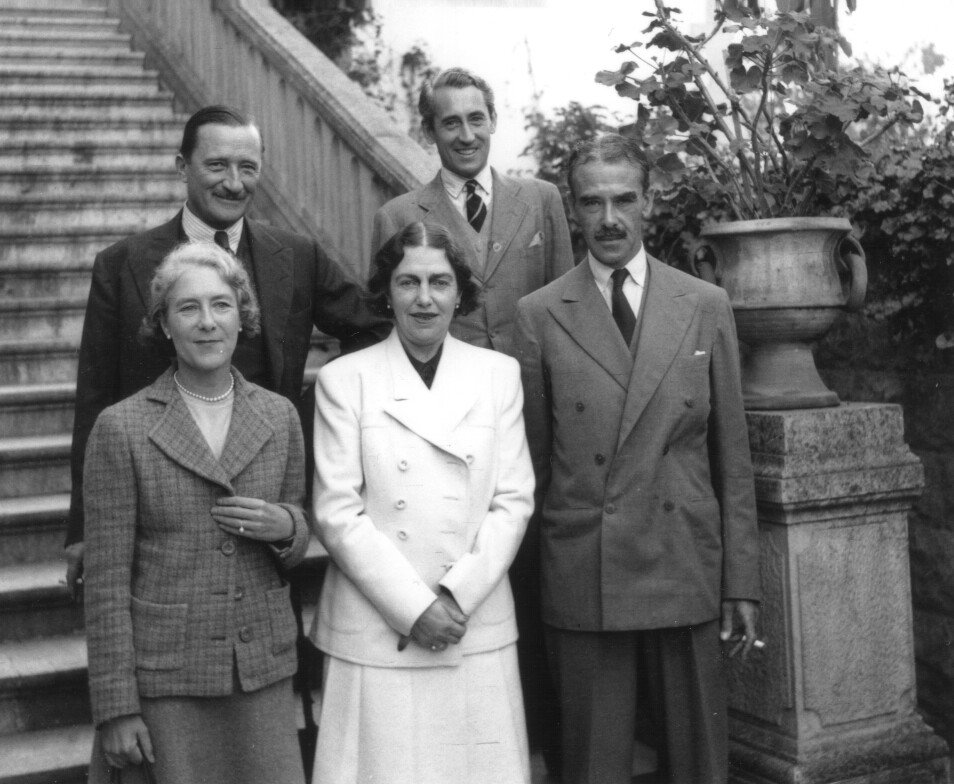
Lady Spears (centre) with Sir Edward Spears (left) in December 1942 in Lebanon on the steps of their residence – that of the First British Minister to the Levant. To the right of Sir Edward stands Henry Hopkinson, private secretary to the Permanent Under-Secretary of State for Foreign Affairs, Sir Alexander Cadogan; Richard Casey, Minister Resident in the Middle East, is to the right of Lady Spears, with Mrs Ethel Casey to her left.

The unit's next posting would be overseas and there would be a requirement for heavy trucks and 30 men who could not only drive but also act as orderlies. De Gaulle was unable to provide this manpower from his forces, but drivers were forthcoming from the American Field Service, and hospital orderlies from the Friends' Ambulance Unit in London – the latter all conscientious objectors. Vehicles, tents, beds, cookers and ward equipment were purchased from the War Office. The vehicles included 15 3-ton Bedford trucks, and the same number of 15-hundredweight trucks, as well as five Ford V8s to transport the nurses and officers. De Gaulle's, Free French had few medical officers and it took months to assemble a team of four doctors who would be led by Colonel Fruchaud. The Mechanised Transport Corps provided 12 drivers.

The equipment and vehicles left Cardiff by sea for Port Sudan at the beginning of February 1941. The personnel sailed on 23 March from Greenock on board the Orient Line liner SS Otranto.

== On active service in the Middle East ==
The Hadfield-Spears unit reached Suez on 2 May, expecting to sail back to Port Sudan and from there to Abyssinia, but plans had changed and they were told to make for Palestine. Their equipment had already been off-loaded at Port Said. During a brief visit to Cairo, Mary Spears met Madame Catroux, wife of General Georges Catroux, General de Gaulle's High Commissioner to the Levant, who did not approve of Free French wounded being cared for by British nurses. However, instead of going to Eritrea and the Sudan, as they had expected, the unit was sent to Sarafand in Palestine, where they were joined by Colonel Fruchaud, a renowned French surgeon, and a French detachment from Eritrea. Passing through Palestine and crossing Transjordania they reached Deraa in Syria.

== See also ==
- American Ambulance Great Britain
- American Ambulance Field Service
- Friends' Ambulance Unit
