= AAGB =

AAGB may refer to:

- American Ambulance Great Britain, a humanitarian organisation founded in 1940
- Astrological Association of Great Britain, a British astrological organisation
