= Angela Sinclair-Loutit =

English social justice activist (1921–2016)

- Born: Angela de Renzy-Martin; 1 March 1921; Kensington, London, England
- Died: 18 August 2016 (aged 95); France
- Education: Somerville College, Oxford
- Occupations: Activist, nurse
- Spouse: Kenneth Sinclair-Loutit
- Children: David Sinclair-Loutit; Stephan Sinclair-Loutit; Jessica Sinclair-Loutit
- Parents: Edward de Renzy-Martin (father); Winifred Hull (mother)

Angela Sinclair-Loutit (1 March 1921 – 18 August 2016) was an English social justice activist, pacifist and nurse.

== Early life ==
She was born in Kensington on St David's Day in 1921, to Winifred de Renzy-Martin (née Hull) and her husband Edward, a lieutenant colonel in the army. She was raised in Hampshire and attended Downe House School in Berkshire. She had a twin brother called David and two older sisters.

== Conscientious objection and the Friends Ambulance Unit ==
In 1940, following the outbreak of the Second World War, she left her PPE studies at Somerville College, Oxford to attend a nursing course run by Lady Louis Mountbatten. She was subsequently posted to a hospital in Weston-super-Mare for six months.

After leaving Weston-super-Mare, she received a letter from her friend Michael Watson telling her about the Friends Ambulance Unit (FAU), and she began to work with them, becoming one of the unit's first female members. She stayed at the London Hospital Students' Hostel on Whitechapel Road with 180 men and only one other woman and worked in the East End throughout the Blitz, distributing first aid, food and drink. She also volunteered to participate in medical experiments, including being bitten by potentially malaria-carrying mosquitos.

After hearing about the experiences of both her parents in the First World War, she was anti-military and was tried by a conscientious objector tribunal, where she was directed to continue her work with the FAU. Her father attended as a witness to the sincerity of her beliefs.

When the Blitz ended in 1941, she became a secretary in the FAU headquarters in London. She then was sent to Khatatba in Egypt, where she worked in a camp for 6,000 Yugoslavian refugees, distributing clothes and running literacy classes. In order to overcome the language difficulties her team faced she learnt Serbo-Croatian. After eight months workers from UNRRA began to arrive to take over running the camp, including doctor Kenneth Sinclair-Loutit, whom Sinclair-Loutit later married.

Sinclair-Loutit was the only female member of the FAU to work in Yugoslavia. She was seconded to the Health Division of UNRRA in Belgrade in 1945 and worked with them for three months before rejoining the FAU in Split. After passing her army truck maintenance test she drove medical supplies from American Liberty ships to Belgrade.

In 1946, she returned to England and married Kenneth Sinclair-Loutit. She worked for the British Red Cross Tracing Service at St James's Street, trying to unite families who had been split up by the war.

== Later life ==
The Sinclair-Loutits had three children and lived in Canada, Thailand, Paris and Morocco, where Kenneth was stationed working as an adviser to UNICEF, before moving back to London in 1972.

Sinclair-Loutit settled in Islington, qualified as a psychiatric social worker at the Polytechnic of North London and worked in north-London hospitals. After her retirement, she wrote for the Islington Gazette and the Tribune, helped found the Islington Pensioners Forum and campaigned against the closure of her local A&E and against the production of nuclear weapons at Aldermaston.

She died at the age of 95, on 18 August 2016, while on holiday in France.
