= Friends' Ambulance Unit =

Volunteer ambulance unit

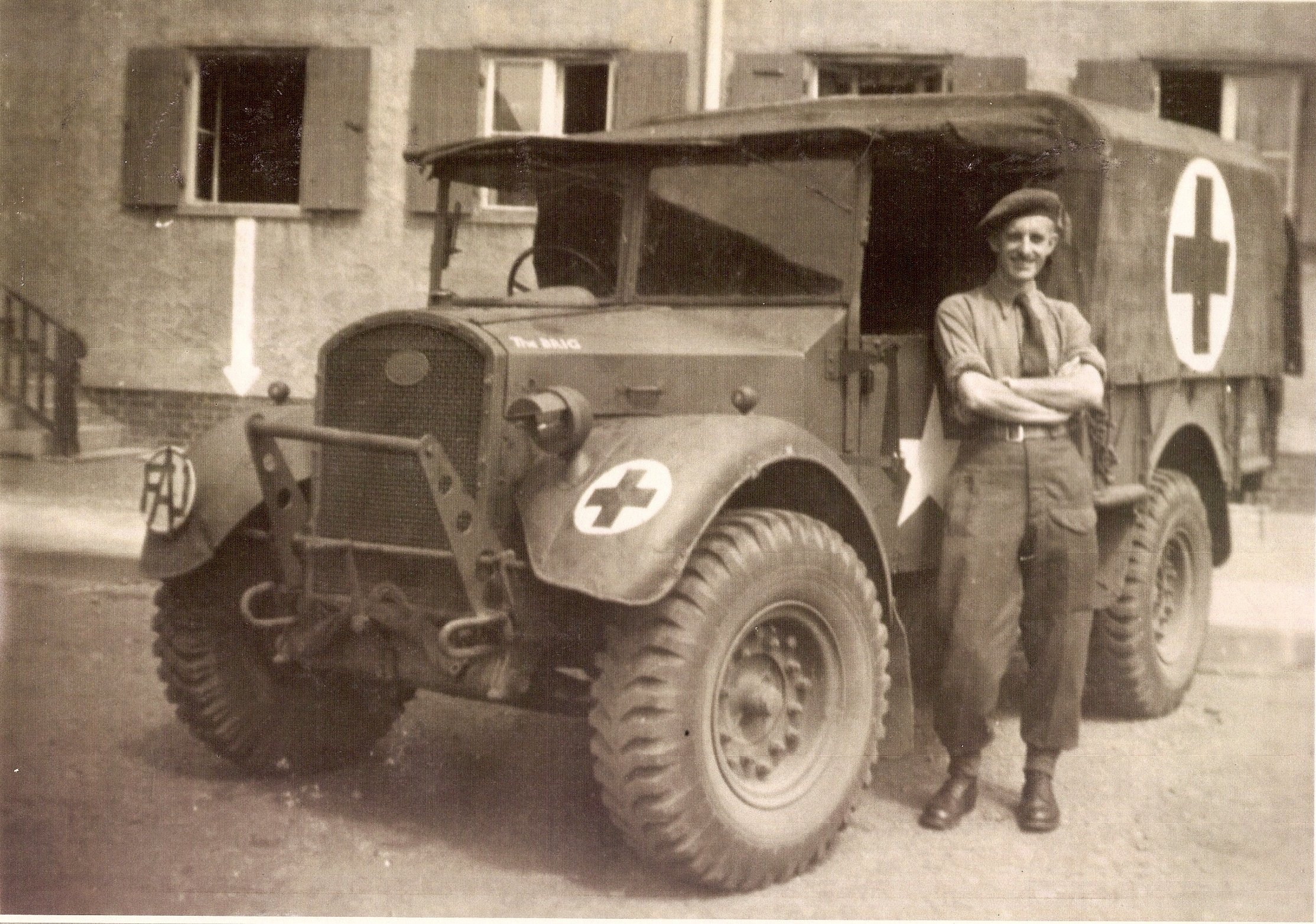
Frank J. Stevens, a Friends Ambulance Unit ambulance driver, with his vehicle in Wolfsburg, Germany, possibly 1945

The Friends' Ambulance Unit (FAU) was a volunteer ambulance service, founded by individual members of the British Religious Society of Friends (Quakers), in line with their Peace Testimony. The FAU operated from 1914 to 1919, 1939 to 1946 and 1946 to 1959 in 25 countries. It was independent of the Quakers' organisation and chiefly staffed by registered conscientious objectors.

== History ==
=== First World War ===
The group that became the Friends' Ambulance Unit began with 60 volunteers, brought together by Philip J. Baker via an appeal published in The Friend. His letter was controversial; in the weeks following its publication, The Friend published several subsequent letters debating the concept of a Quaker ambulance unit. Despite this, Baker eventually secured material support and access to a training ground. His initial group of volunteers was trained at Jordans, a hamlet in Buckinghamshire that was a centre for Quakerism.

Their training was initiated without an immediate plan for mobilisation. By its end, in mid-October 1914, no clear opportunity had appeared, and the trainees were sent back to their homes. At the same time, the lack of sufficient medical care on the war front was becoming increasingly apparent to military authorities. An acquaintance of Baker's, Sir Arthur Stanley, was chairman of the British Red Cross Society's Joint War Commission. After receiving a report on the dire needs of the wounded from the war reporter Geoffrey Winthrop Young, Stanley was reminded of the Quaker volunteers, and suggested their deployment.

==== Early activities ====
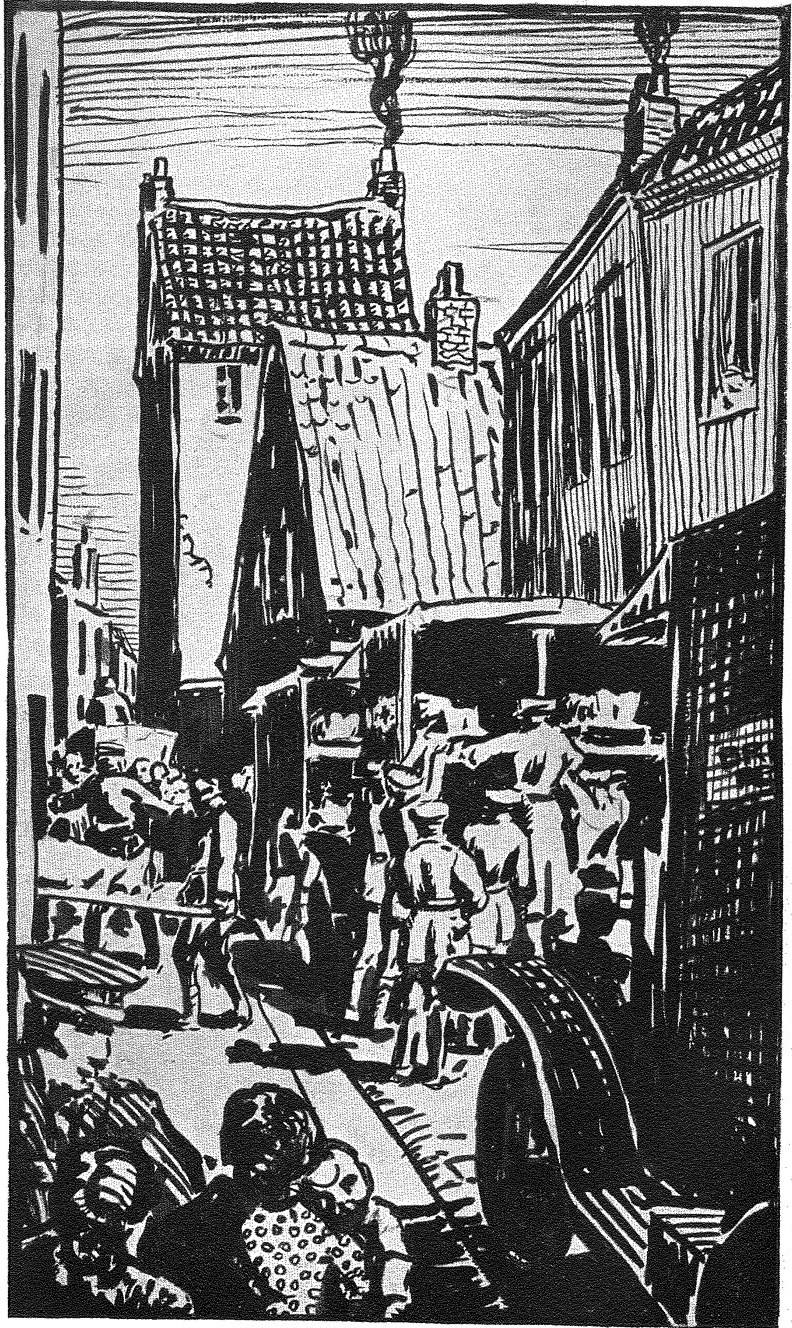
Civilian hospital evacuation at Béthune, Pas-de-Calais during the First World War; drawing by FAU volunteer Ernest Procter

In late October 1914, 43 of Baker’s volunteers were formally mobilised as The First Anglo-Belgian Ambulance Unit, later renamed the Friends’ Ambulance Unit. This Unit was organised under the supervision of the Joint War Committee.

They were pressed into service almost immediately. While making their initial voyage from Dover to Dunkirk, the FAU encountered HMS Hermes, sinking after being struck by a German torpedo, and rendered emergency aid to her crew. The volunteers had no chance to rest when they actually reached Dunkirk. Upon their arrival, they were again immediately called to provide medical care, this time for a group of around 3,000 badly wounded soldiers sheltering in nearby railway sheds.

Once the situation at the railway sheds was under control, the Unit searched for additional ways to be of service. At first, they primarily worked alongside the French Armed Forces Health Service. Their first hospital, the Hospital St. Pierre, was opened in Dunkirk in coordination with the Service. This partnership also allowed them to begin their ambulance work in earnest, evacuating French wounded from the Ypres front near Woesten. By early 1915, The Friends' Ambulance Unit had established relationships with French, Belgian, and British military authorities, as well as an additional military hospital.

==== Civilian relief in Ypres ====
As the Unit developed its ambulance service in Ypres, they discovered an emerging civilian crisis. Though the majority of Ypres’ civilians had been evacuated by late 1914, a large number remained behind, hidden in cellars and scattered across the countryside. These civilians were vulnerable to illness, malnutrition, and the deadly violence of an active war zone. The Unit quickly mounted a response.

Between the First and Second Battle of Ypres, the FAU established two civilian hospitals in the area: the Chateau Elisabeth in Poperinghe, and the Sacré Couer in Ypres itself. Their humanitarian work was made possible through cooperation with local partners, such as Father Charles Camiel Delaere and the Sisters of La Motte. These partners provided translation services, material support, staffing, and leadership. Besides medical aid, the Unit’s relief activities eventually expanded to include supply distribution, organizing gainful employment for refugees, screening for typhoid, and inoculation.

The outbreak of the Second Battle of Ypres, which involved the first significant use of gas weaponry on the Western Front, forced a rapid end to the FAU's civilian relief in the region. As the fighting escalated, British military authorities ordered a definitive evacuation of all remaining civilians. The entirety of the FAU's ambulance fleet was mobilised to support this effort. The final evacuation involved an estimated 5,000 civilians.

The FAU was widely recognised for its exemplary service in Ypres. Besides the unit as a whole receiving letters of thanks from Flemish civilian organisations, Geoffrey Young (who served as a leader of the Unit) and Father Delaere both received the Order of Leopold for their work.

==== After Ypres ====
Between the end of their time in Ypres and early 1916, the FAU transitioned from an initial “knight-errant” stage, in which the Unit’s activities and relationships with military authorities were relatively fluid, to an organised and regularised unit. This was partly due to the British Military Service Act, which mandated conscription and defined the terms of exemption for conscientious objectors. Under these terms, the FAU was recognised as a legitimate form of alternative service for conscientious objectors, which led to the rapid expansion of the Unit and closer alignment with the British military in particular.

The FAU remained active throughout the war, and it continued to provide humanitarian aid for a year after Armistice. The Unit finally disbanded in 1919. By the end of the war, the Friends' Ambulance Unit’s volunteer staff had grown to over 1000 individuals, serving in France, Belgium, Italy, and in the Home Service Section. This number included 102 women. At various stages of the war, 420 additional volunteers were engaged with the FAU in various capacities.

=== Second World War and aftermath ===
It was refounded by a committee of former members at the start of World War II in September 1939 with the establishment of a training camp at Manor Farm, Bristol Road, Northfield, Birmingham. More than 1,300 members were trained and went on to serve as ambulance drivers and medical orderlies in London during the Blitz, as well as overseas in Finland, Norway and Sweden (1940), the Middle East (1940–1943), Greece (1941, 1944–1946), China and Syria (1941–1946), India and Ethiopia (1942–1945), Italy (1943–1946), France, Belgium, Netherlands, Yugoslavia and Germany (1944–1946) and Austria (1945–1946). Its first female member was Angela Sinclair-Loutit, who joined in 1940 after her studies at Somerville College, Oxford were interrupted.

==== China Convoy ====
The Sino-Japanese War had led to deteriorating conditions in China and in 1941 agreement was reached for the FAU to deploy 40 volunteers to deliver medical aid (dubbed the "China Convoy"). At first, their job was to secure the delivery of supplies via the "Burma Road", the sole remaining route. When Burma fell to the Japanese in May 1942, the FAU volunteers escaped to India and China. They regrouped and took on the distribution of medical supplies delivered by "The Hump", the air transport route to Kunming. It is estimated that 80% of medical supplies to China were distributed by the FAU.

The FAU's role expanded and they provided a range medical treatments, preventative measures and training of Chinese medical personnel. This expanded further into the reconstruction of medical facilities, notably the hospital at Tengchong in 1944, and into agricultural improvements and training.

The activities in China were international, employing personnel, men and women, from Britain (the largest national group), China, United States, Canada, New Zealand and elsewhere. Around 200 foreigners and 60 Chinese took part, eight died and others had their health permanently damaged. About half of the recruits were Quakers but all had a commitment to pacifism and wished to deliver practical help. Most of the Chinese members were Christian students from the West China Union University of Chengdu.

Responsibility for the relief work in China was passed to the American Friends Service Committee in 1946.

==== Northern Europe ====
Two 12-man sections with eight vehicles, FAU Relief Sections Nos 1 and 2, landed at Arromanches, Normandy on 6 September 1944 from a tank landing craft. Attached to the British Army's civilian affairs branch, the FAU sections provided relief to civilians in Normandy. No 2 FAU was then posted to a newly liberated refugee camp at Leopoldsburg, Belgium, managing reception, registration, disinfection, catering, dormitories and departures.

In November 1944, in response to a request from 21st Army Group, a further five more sections were established and arrived in Europe at the end of 1944. One new member was Gerald Gardiner, who subsequently became Lord Chancellor in Harold Wilson's Labour Party government of 1964–1970.

After a period in Nijmegen, assisting local civilian medical organisations during Operation Market Garden, No 2 FAU cared for a colony of the mentally ill near Cleves in Germany which grew to a population of 25,000. By April, the main work had become the accommodation and care of displaced persons until they could return home. No 2 FAU was heavily involved with the care and support of inmates at the newly liberated Stalag X-B prisoner-of-war camp near Sandbostel, between Bremen and Hamburg in northern Germany in May 1945.

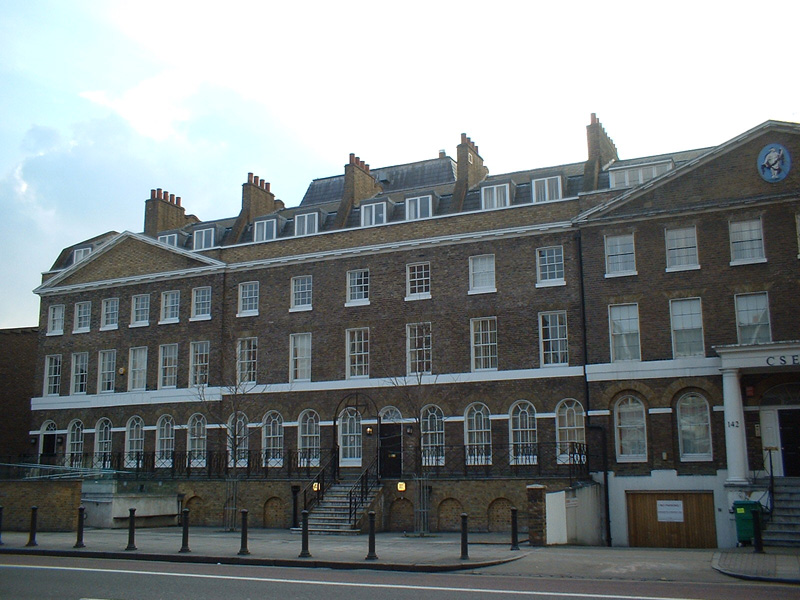

The FAU was wound up in 1946 and replaced by the Friends Ambulance Unit Post-War Service, which continued until 1959.

The work of the Friends' Ambulance Unit was referred to in the 1947 award of the Nobel Peace Prize to Quakers worldwide and accepted by the Friends Service Council and the American Friends Service Committee.

== Purpose ==
The original trainees in the 1939 training camp issued a statement expressing their purpose:

We purpose to train ourselves as an efficient Unit to undertake ambulance and relief work in areas under both civilian and military control, and so, by working as a pacifist and civilian body where the need is greatest, to demonstrate the efficacy of co-operating to build up a new world rather than fighting to destroy the old. While respecting the views of those pacifists who feel they cannot join an organization such as our own, we feel concerned among the bitterness and conflicting ideologies of the present situation to build up a record of goodwill and positive service, hoping that this will help to keep uppermost in men's minds those values which are so often forgotten in war and immediately afterwards.

== People associated with the FAU ==
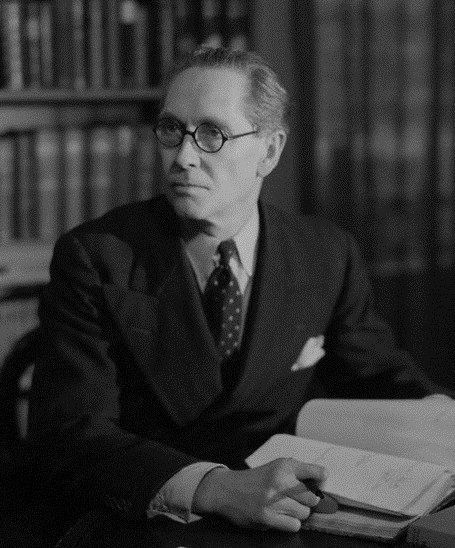
Philip Noel-Baker, FAU initiator, Nobel Peace Prize 1959

- Sir Fulque Agnew, 10th Baronet (1900–1975), university administrator
- Horace Alexander (1889–1989), barrister and advocate of international arbitration (ODNB entry)
- Laurie Baker (1917–2007), architect
- Chris Barber (1921–2012), chair of Oxfam
- John Henry Barlow (1855–1924)
- F. Ralph Barlow (1910–1980), General Manager, Bournville Village Trust (1945–1973). Son of John Henry Barlow. Led FAU units in China, India, South Africa, Ethiopia (1939–1944)
- Frank Blackaby (1921–2000), economist and peace campaigner (ODNB entry)
- Russell Brain, 1st Baron Brain (1895–1966), physician and medical administrator (ODNB entry)
- Edgar Kenneth Brown, (1918–1965), architect
- Sir John Bevan Braithwaite (1884–1973), stockbroker (ODNB entry)
- Richard Bevan Braithwaite (1900–1990), philosopher (ODNB entry)
- Laurence John Cadbury (1889–1982), chocolate and food manufacturer (ODNB entry)
- Cecil John Cadoux (1883–1947), theologian (ODNB entry)
- Demetrios Capetanakis (1912–1944), poet and literary critic (ODNB entry)
- Sydney Carter (1915–2004), English poet, songwriter
- St John Pettifor Catchpool (1890–1971), social worker (ODNB entry)
- Selby Clewer (1917–2001), architect
- Alan Clodd (1918–2002), publisher, book collector, and dealer
- Stephen Pit Corder (1918–1990), university professor (ODNB entry)
- Ralph Henry Carless Davis (1918–1991), historian
- John Done
- Christopher Prout Driver (1932–1997), journalist and writer on food (ODNB entry)
- Theodore Fox (1899–1989), medical editor (ODNB entry)
- Gerald Gardiner, Baron Gardiner (1900–1990), Lord Chancellor from 1964 to 1970
- Roland Johnston Harris (1919–1969), schoolteacher, university lecturer, and poet
- Ruth Harrison (1920–2000), animal welfare campaigner (ODNB entry)
- W. F. Harvey (1885–1937), writer of short stories
- F. R. G. Heaf (1894–1973), physician (ODNB entry)
- John Hick (1922–2012), philosopher of religion
- Eric Holttum (1895–1990), botanist (ODNB entry)
- Kenneth Hudson (1916–1999), industrial archaeologist and museologist (ODNB entry)
- F. R. Leavis (1895–1978), literary critic
- Frank Lees (1931–1999), chemical engineer
- Kingsley Martin (1897–1969), journalist
- David Elwyn Morris (1920-2015), Solicitor and Author of China Changed My Mind (Cassells, 1948)
- Christopher Nevinson (1889–1946), artist
- Henry Woodd Nevinson (1856–1941), social activist and journalist (ODNB entry)
- George Newman (doctor) (1870–1948), public health physician
- Donald Nicol (1923–2003), British Byzantinist
- Philip Noel-Baker (1889–1982), politician, diplomat, academic
- Wilfrid Noyce (1917–1962), mountaineer and writer (ODNB entry)
- Robert Nye (1936 – 2016), writer
- Lionel Penrose (1898–1972), physician (ODNB entry)
- Roland Penrose (1900–1984), artist, writer, and exhibition organiser (ODNB entry)
- Arthur Cecil Pigou (1877–1959), economist and mountaineer
- John Rawlings Rees (1890–1969), psychiatrist (ODNB entry)
- Lewis Fry Richardson (1881–1953), mathematician, physicist, meteorologist, psychologist
- Michael Rowntree (1919–2007), a journalist and Chairman of Oxfam
- Tessa Rowntree (1909-1999), aid worker in Czechoslovakia and London
- George William Series (1920–1995), spectroscopist (ODNB entry)
- Angela Sinclair-Loutit (1921–2016), social justice activist, pacifist and nurse
- Olaf Stapledon (1886–1950), philosopher and author of science fiction
- Peter Derek Strevens (1922–1989), linguistic scholar and applied linguist (ODNB entry)
- Donald Swann (1923–1994), composer, musician and entertainer
- Frederick Tattersfield (1881–1959), agricultural chemist (ODNB entry)
- Lewis Edgar Waddilove (1914–2000), social reformer (ODNB entry)
- Richard Wainwright (1918–2003), Liberal MP
- John Seldon Whale (1896–1997), United Reformed church minister and theologian (ODNB entry)
- Duncan Wood, Headed up China Convey, son of HG Wood below
- Herbert George Wood (1879–1963), theologian and historian (ODNB entry)
- Maurice Woodhead, (1915-1974) electrical retailer
- Geoffrey Winthrop Young (1876–1958), mountaineer, poet and educator
- Dennis Woodcock (1917-2006), banker

== Records ==
Much archival material has survived and has been deposited at the Library of the Society of Friends, Friends House, Euston Road, London.

== See also ==
=== Wartime Civilian Ambulance Organisations ===
- American Ambulance Great Britain
- American Ambulance Field Service
- Hadfield-Spears Ambulance Unit

=== Conscientious objection ===
- Conscientious objector#United Kingdom
- Conscientious objection throughout the world#Conscientious objection in Britain
- Military Service Act (United Kingdom)

== Bibliography ==
- Miles, James E.; Tatham, Meaburn (1919). The Friends' Ambulance Unit, 1914–1919: a record. London: Swarthmore Press.
- Tegla Davies, Arfor (1947). Friends Ambulance Unit – The Story of the F.A.U. in the Second World War 1939–1945. London: George Allen & Unwin Limited. LCCN 48022555. Archived from the original on 12 May 2012.
- Clifford Barnard (1999). Two weeks in May 1945: Sandbostel Concentration Camp and the Friends Ambulance Unit. London: Quaker Home Service. ISBN 0-85245-315-9.
- Bush, Roger (1998). FAU : the third generation : Friends Ambulance Unit post-war service and international service 1946–1959. York: William Sessions Limited. ISBN 1-85072-211-0.
- Smith, Lyn (1998). Pacifists in Action: Experience of the Friends Ambulance Unit in the Second World War. York: William Sessions Limited. ISBN 1-85072-215-3.
- McClelland, Grigor, Embers of War: Letters from a Relief Worker in the British Zone of Germany, 1945-46 (1997) London, Bloomsbury Academic. ISBN 9781860643125
- FAU films: The Unit (Stephen Peet, 1941); Friends Ambulance Unit (1939-1946) (Stephen Peet, 1943-1946).
- FAU journal The Chronicle 1939-1946.
- Wynter, Rebecca (1 December 2016). "Conscription, Conscience and Controversy: The Friends' Ambulance Unit and the 'Middle Course' in the First World War". Quaker Studies. 21 (2): 213–233. doi:10.3828/quaker.2016.21.2.6.
- Meyer, J. (2015). "Neutral Caregivers or Military Support?: the British Red Cross, The Friends' Ambulance Unit, and the problems of voluntary medical aid in wartime". War & Society. 34 (2): 105–120. doi:10.1179/0729247314Z.00000000050. PMC 4497454. PMID 26213442.
- Palfreeman, Linda (2017). Friends in Flanders: Humanitarian Aid Administered by the Friends' Ambulance Unit during the First World War. Brighton: Sussex Academic press. ISBN 9781845198718.
