= Demetrios Capetanakis =

Greek poet, essayist and critic

- Born: 22 January 1912; Izmir / Smyrna, Ottoman Empire
- Died: 9 March 1944 (aged 32); London, UK

Demetrios Capetanakis or Kapetanakis or Capetanaces (Greek: Δημήτριος Καπετανάκης; 22 January 1912 in Smyrna – 9 March 1944 in London) was a Greek poet, essayist, and critic. For the last five years of his life (1939-1944) he lived in Britain and associated with the Bloomsbury Set, wrote some poetry in English.

== Biography ==
Demetrios Capetanakis was born on 22 January 1912 in the port of Smyrna or Izmir (then in the Ottoman Empire, now in Turkey). His father worked in the port as a doctor. In 1922 his father died, and in the same year he came to Athens, when his mother fled the Asia Minor Catastrophe with her three children.

He was a graduate in political science and economics from Athens University, where he was taught by Panagiotis Kanellopoulos (whom he would encounter again in the Greek government in exile in London). Afterwards he became a Doctor of Philosophy at the University of Heidelberg (1934). In Germany he became interested in the ideas of Stefan George, which he ultimately rejected as a forerunner of Nazism.

In Greece he had several philosophic studies published - including one on The Struggle of the Solitary Soul and one on The Mythology of Beauty - as well as translations of poems by Holderlin (1938).

In 1939 with a scholarship from the British Council he came to Britain, to study at the University of Cambridge under Dadie Rylands.

He became a protégé of the poet Edith Sitwell. In 1941 he met the poet and publisher John Lehmann, who published Capetanakis in New Writing and became a close friend. Through Lehmann he met William Plomer.

For a short period he went to Birmingham to help a team of the Friends Ambulance Unit prepare for relief work in Greece as soon as that country should be liberated from Nazi occupation; he was supported by Elizabeth Cadbury. In 1942 he was diagnosed with leucaemia. He died in London on 9 March 1944 at Westminster Hospital, and was buried at West Norwood Cemetery.

Three years after Capetanakis's death John Lehmann collected his poems and essays and published them as Demetrios Capetanakis A Greek Poet In England (1947). This slim book contains sixteen English poems by Capetanakis, two verse translations by him from Prevelakis and one from Elytis and eleven of his essays - 'The Greeks Are Human Beings', 'Ghika', 'Rimbaud', 'Stefan George', 'A Lecture On Proust', 'Dostoevsky', 'Thomas Gray And Horace Walpole', 'A View Of English Poetry', 'Notes On Some Contemporary Writers', 'Charlotte Brontë' and 'An Introduction To Modern Greek Poetry'. These are accompanied by an Introduction by John Lehmann and tributes by Edith Sitwell ('The Poetry Of Demetrios Capetanakis'), P. Canellopoulos ('My Friend Demetrios Capetanakis') and William Plomer ('A Recollection') and a portrait photograph by Hans Wild.

The English poet and teacher Charles Causley (1917-2003) subtitled his poem 'Master and Pupil' "On a theme of Demetrios Capetanakis".

'Three poems of Demetrios Capetanakis' were set to music for voice and piano by Ned Rorem (1968).

An archive of Capetanakis's manuscripts and correspondence is kept at the American School of Classical Studies at Athens.
