= British War Relief Society =

- Founded: 1939
- Dissolved: 1945
- Purpose: Humanitarian
- Location: United States
- Region served: Great Britain
- Method: Aid

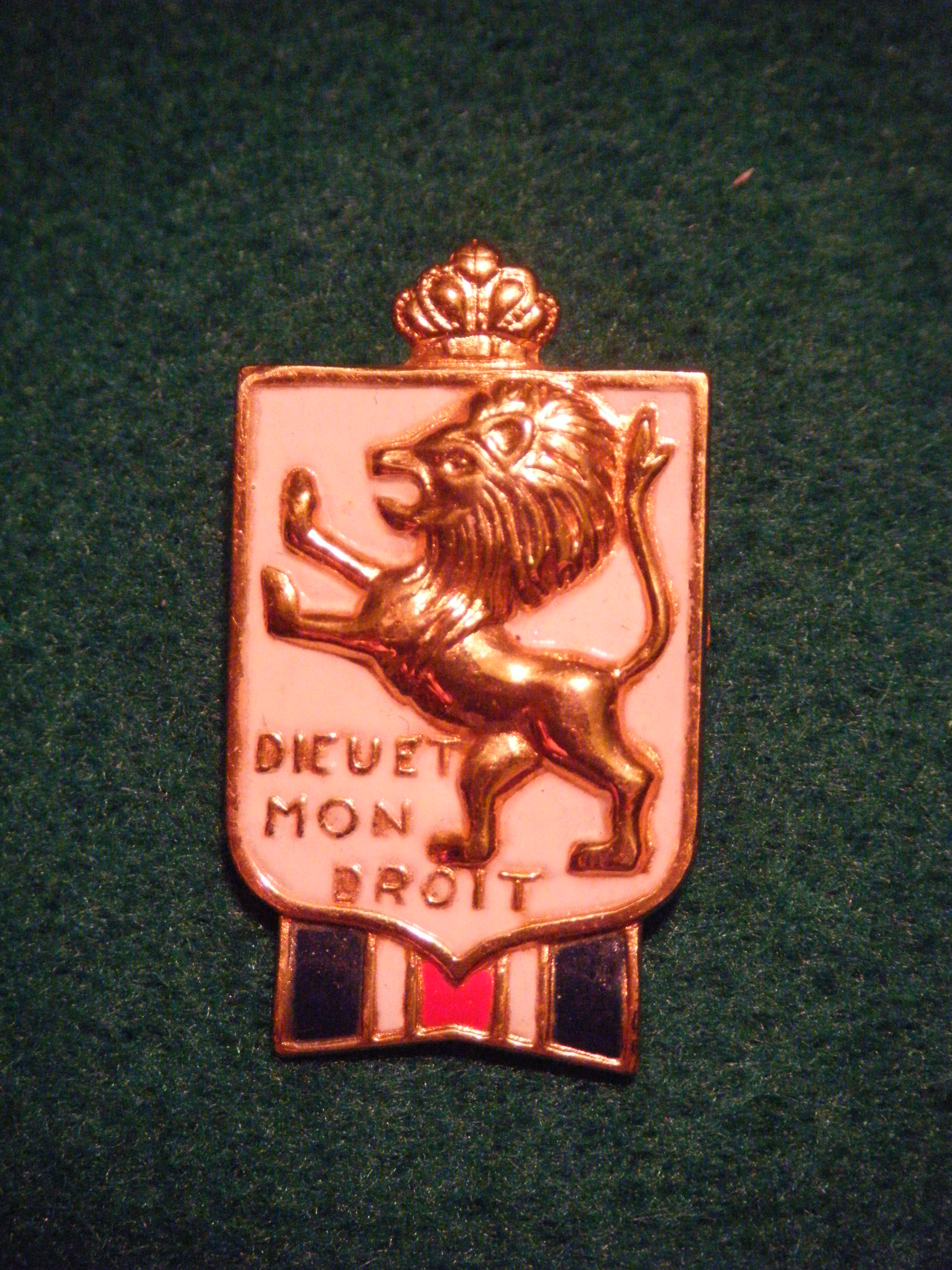
BWRS lapel pin

The British War Relief Society (BWRS) was a US-based humanitarian umbrella organisation dealing with the supply of non-military aid such as food, clothes, medical supplies and financial aid to people in Great Britain during the early years of the Second World War. The organisation acted as the administrative hub and central receiving depot for items donated from other charities which were then parceled out to its affiliate organizations in the US and to Britain. These donations were raised in the name of the BWRS, rather than in the name of the smaller groups.

== History of movement ==
Before the United States declared war on Japan in December 1941, the US had remained isolationist with regards to the events happening in Europe and elsewhere but had aided Britain via the Lend-Lease program. Also, from September 1939 through to the end of the war, various charitable organisations in the US collected money and items to alleviate the hardships and suffering of the British general public.

As the war progressed, and the British need for aid grew, a large number of charities appeared across the US to aid Britain – amongst them (but by no means all) American Ambulances in Great Britain, the American Committee for Air Raid Relief, American Hospital in Britain, British American Ambulance Corps, the British Hospital Association and Bundles for Britain.

Incorporated in 1941, the British War Relief Society managed the activities of the various other charitable associations, in a similar way to the United Service Organizations (USO). The BWRS was headquartered on Fifth Avenue, in New York City.

The BWRS continued to supply humanitarian goods throughout the war.

== Bundles for Britain ==
While many of the smaller charities were covered by the activities of the BWRS, the major exception was the "Bundles for Britain" organisation, founded by Natalie Wales Latham

Bundles for Britain was started in 1940 by Mrs. Latham as a knitting circle in a store front in New York City. Knitted goods—socks, gloves, hats, sweaters, and scarves—were made and shipped to Britain. Within Sixteen months, Latham expanded Bundles into an organization with 975 branches and almost a million contributors, and by the spring of 1941, it had delivered 40,000 sleeveless sweaters, 10,000 sweaters with sleeves, 30,000 scarves, 18,000 pairs of seaboot stockings, 50,000 pairs of socks, and 8,000 caps. By 1941, moreover, Bundles had also shipped ambulances, surgical instruments, medicines, cots, blankets, field-kitchen units, and operating tables, along with used clothing of all sorts. The total value of goods shipped reached $1,500,000; another $1,000,000 was raised in cash.

Mrs. Latham was highly recognized for this wartime effort, being invested by King George VI as an honorary Commander of the Order of the British Empire in 1946, the first non-British subject to receive this honor. Her story may have even served as inspiration for the Cary Grant movie Mr. Lucky. In 1953, she married, as her fourth husband, Lord Malcolm Douglas-Hamilton.

== Memorabilia ==
Bundles for Britain, the BWRS and its affiliates have provided a wealth of items for collectors of home front memorabilia. Some of the more common items are button lapel pins. These display the British War Relief emblem of a lion rampant and shield. A high number feature the French motto Dieu et mon Droit, the motto of the British monarch and translated as "God and my right".

All pins are labelled on the back as either "Official Bundles for Britain" or, more commonly, "Official BWRS and BB". Larger brooches were for women, whilst the smaller pin came in pinback and screwback varieties for men. To raise funds the pins were originally sold for $2.50 and $1 respectively in 1941.

The success of the RAF during the Battle of Britain led to a number of pins being designed on the RAF wings. Often with a monogram of RAF to the front and with BB (Bundles for Britain) or BWRS marked on the reverse. Produced in vermeil (24k goldplate over sterling) with enamel and are made by Monet or Accessocraft, two costume jewelry manufacturers.

Other items sold to raise money included ceramics, books, stamps, celluloid badges, cinderellas, cigarette cases and compacts. Matchbooks were an inexpensive form of advertising and local branches of the BWRS, its affiliates and Bundles for Britain produced their own matchbooks.

=== Official song ===
The song "Thumbs Up!" (aka "British Delivers the Goods"), composed (words and music) in 1941 by Moe Jaffe, Jack O'Brien, and Bert Lee (pseudonym of Bert Lown, was the official theme song of the British War Relief Society. The song became the theme and movie title for the 1943 film, Thumbs Up.

== See also ==
Russian War Relief
