= American Ambulance Great Britain =

- Founded: 1940
- Purpose: Humanitarian
- Region served: United Kingdom
- Method: Emergency casualty transport

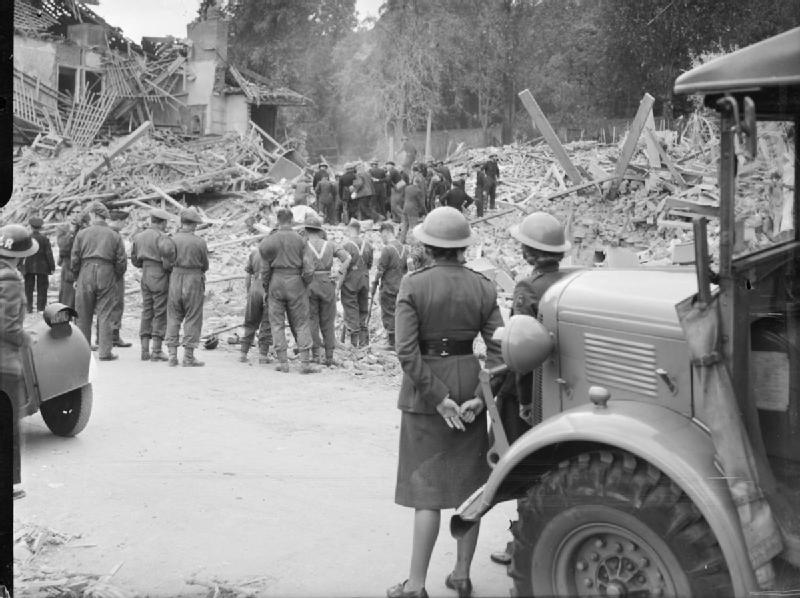
Two members of the AAGB stand by their Austin K2/Y ambulance, waiting for casualties as rescue work takes place after a V-1 flying bomb strike in Upper Norwood in South London (1944)

American Ambulance, Great Britain (AAGB) (sometimes wrongly referred to as the Anglo-American Ambulance Unit) was a humanitarian organisation founded in 1940 by a group of Americans living in London for the purpose of providing emergency vehicles and ambulance crews to the United Kingdom during World War II. The idea for the service came from Gilbert H. Carr during a meeting of The American Society in London shortly after the Dunkirk evacuation.

Funding came from private donations, both from Americans expatriates living in the United Kingdom and from the United States and the organisation was headed by Wallace B. Phillips (Joseph P. Kennedy, then United States Ambassador to the United Kingdom, was Honorary Chairman). Within six weeks of being set up £140,000 had been raised. By the end of 1940 the organisation had raised $856,000.

American Ambulance, Great Britain eventually operated a fleet of around 300 vehicles.

== Organisation ==
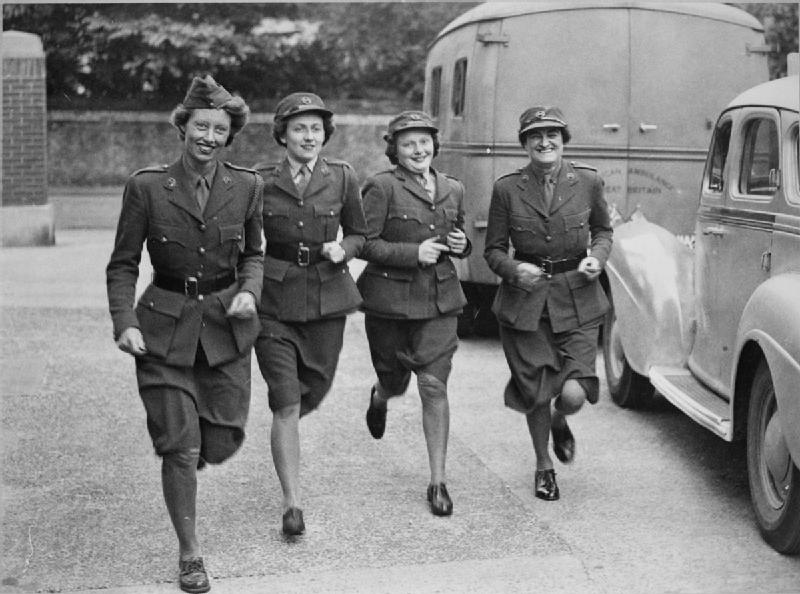
Members of the American Ambulance, Great Britain, run to their vehicles, 1941

The American Ambulance, Great Britain, operated from 17 stations across mainland Britain with five located in London and one each in Cardiff, Cambridge, Birmingham, Bristol, Edinburgh, Glasgow, Leeds, Manchester, Newcastle, Nottingham, Reading and Tunbridge Wells.

For most of the War, the headquarters were at 9 Grosvenor Gardens in London, formerly the offices of The Pyrene Company Limited. In March 1945 it moved to 44 Lower Belgrave Street.

=== Personnel ===
The ambulance staff were British women aged between 18 and 45 and numbered around 400, some of whom were seconded from the Mechanised Transport Corps (for Women) and the Women's Transport Services (FANY). Members of the AAGB wore the tunic and skirt uniform as worn by those in the FANY but with crossed British and American flags on the sleeve. All training was undertaken in Leeds.

During the course of the war, at least two members of the organisation were killed on active service:

- Officer Ensign, Marjorie Stewart Butler (née Pullar). The night of the 10/11 May 1941 saw the largest German air-raid against London, resulting in 1436 civilian deaths. The Alexandra Hotel, Knightsbridge was one of the buildings hit. Butler (one of the AAGB Headquarters staff) was in one of the first ambulances on the scene and went inside to help casualties. But part of the damaged building collapsed on her; she later died of her injuries. Butler was married to Colonel Richard Butler, an army officer who had a long career serving in India. Her son, an RAF pilot, was killed in Italy in 1944.
- Driver Dorothy Helen Daly (née Samuels), killed on the 4 May 1942. The house she was billeted in on Spicer Road, Exeter was bombed during the Exeter Blitz. One other member of the AAGB was injured in the attack. Daly was the daughter of the Irish judge and politician Arthur Samuels.

=== Vehicles ===
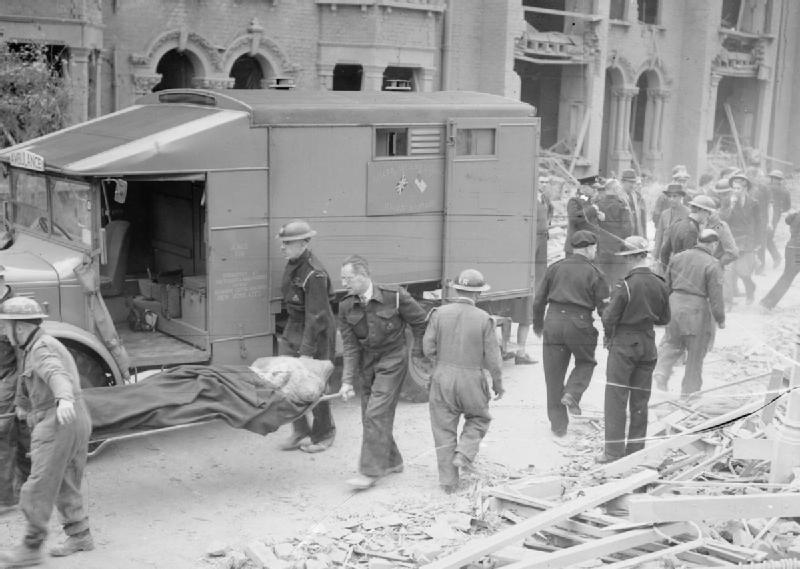
An AAGB Austin K2/Y ambulance attending the aftermath of a V-1 attack in Upper Norwood, London, 1944

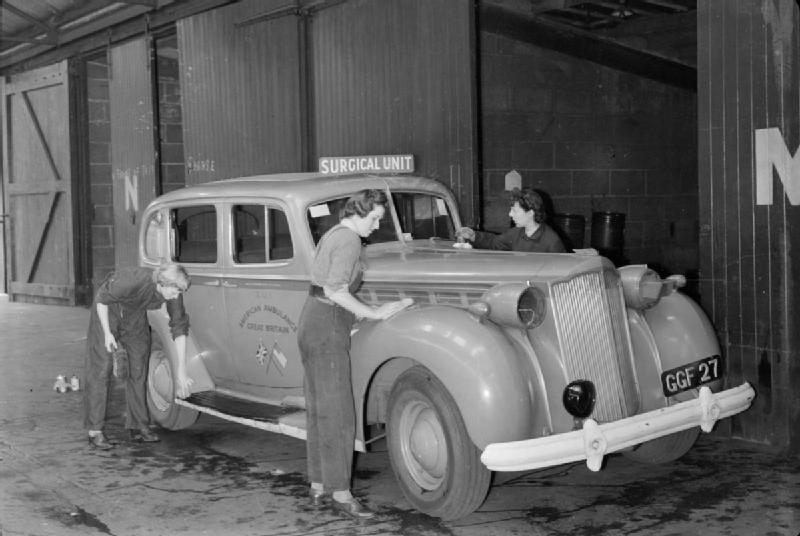
AAGB staff wash a Surgical Unit car, a Packard Super Eight, London 1944

All the AAGB's vehicles were painted grey with a red strip and an emblem featuring the British and American flags. Depending on the purpose several types of vehicle were operated by the AAGB

- Ambulances attended bombing incidents and transferred casualties to local hospitals and first aid posts. The vehicles were also used to transfer patients (often over great distance) requiring specialist treatment. Several types of vehicle were used - the Ford R.O.I.T, the Ford Clara a (converted panel van), the Austin K2/Y and Chevrolet Ambulances, based on American Chevrolet vans. A small number of ambulances built by Bedford were also operated.
- Mobile First-Aid Posts were adapted Fordson E83W vans. They were specially adapted to navigate along roads strewn with rubble and debris following an air raid. These units were able to treat several hundred casualties. These mobile units were accompanied by a truck carrying doctors, nurses and stretcher-bearers.
- Surgical Units were vehicles detailed to a local hospital. Their intended purpose was to transport medical teams to a bomb site. But they eventually became mostly used for moving casualties. These vehicles were mostly large American saloon cars.

=== Maintenance ===
The cost of maintaining the vehicles was met via subscriptions managed through the British War Relief Society of America.

== Gallery of AAGB photographs ==
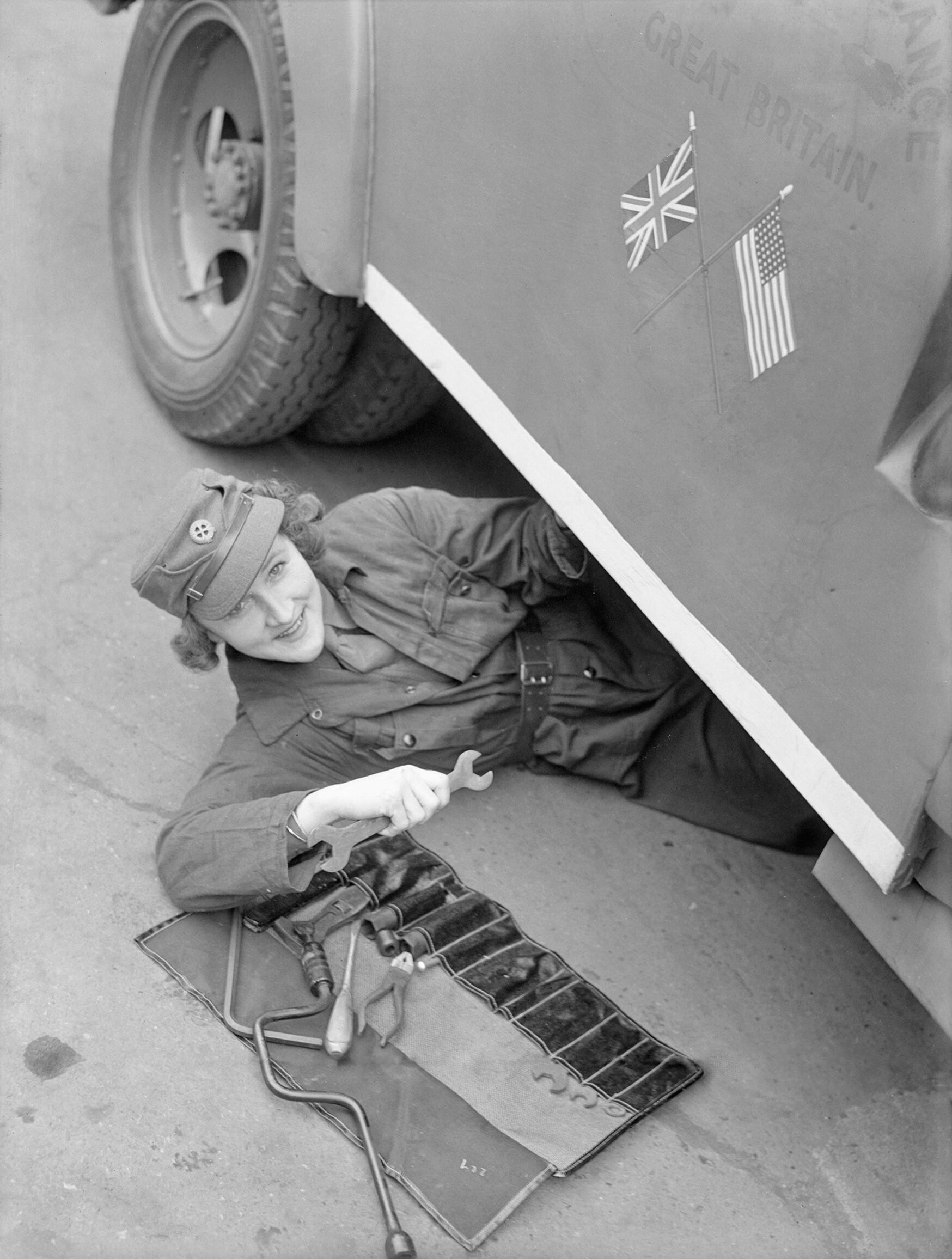
Maintenance of an AAGB ambulance, 1940.

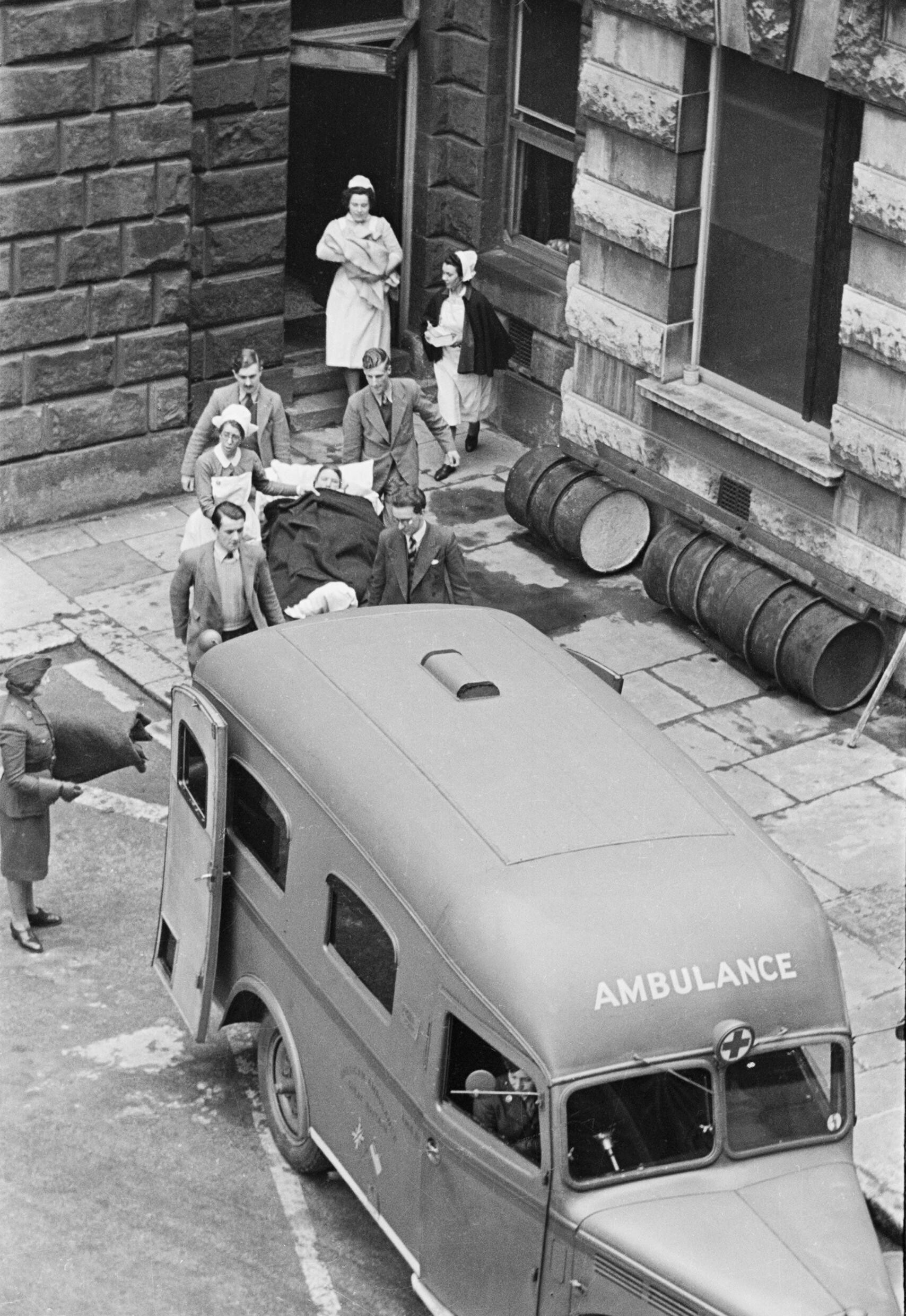
A patient being placed in an ambulance at Guy's Hospital, London. An AAGB member can be seen on the left, 1941.

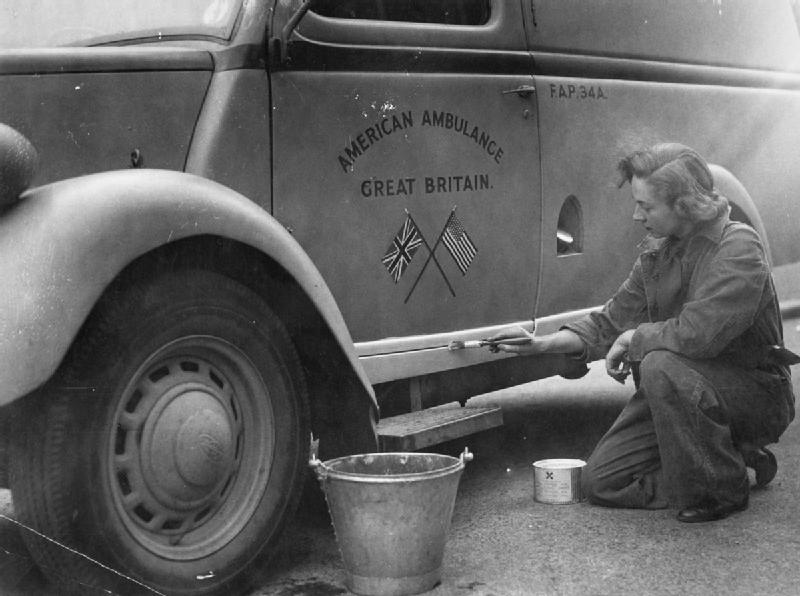
An AAGB member paints a white line around the bottom of her ambulance, in order to make it more visible in the blackout, 1941.

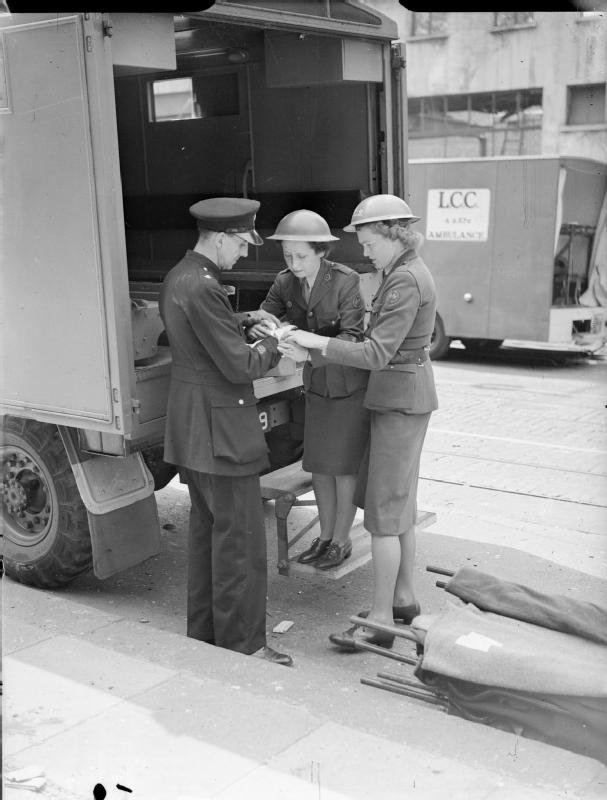
A police officer has his hand bandaged at the rear of an AAGB Austin K2/Y following a V1 attack in Upper Norwood, 1944.

== See also ==
- American Ambulance Field Service
- Hadfield-Spears Ambulance Unit
- British War Relief Society
- Friends' Ambulance Unit
