= Peel and Dufferin Regiment =

Canadian infantry unit active 1866–1936

The Peel and Dufferin Regiment
- Active: 1866–1936
- Country: Canada
- Branch: Canadian Militia
- Type: Line Infantry
- Role: Light Infantry
- Size: One regiment
- Part of: Non-Permanent Active Militia
- Garrison/HQ: Brampton, Ontario
- Motto(s): Latin: Pro Aris et Focis, lit. 'For Hearth and Home'
- March: Quick: John Peel
- Engagements: South African War; First World War
- Battle honours: See #Battle Honours

The Peel and Dufferin Regiment was an infantry regiment of the Non-Permanent Active Militia of the Canadian Militia (now the Canadian Army). First organized in 1866 as the 36th Peel Battalion of Infantry, the regiment was reorganized in 1900 as the 36th Peel Regiment. Following the First World War, the regiment was reorganized again in 1920 as The Peel Regiment and for the final time in 1923 as The Peel and Dufferin Regiment. In 1936, the regiment was Amalgamated with The Lorne Rifles (Scottish) to form The Lorne Scots (Peel, Dufferin and Halton Regiment).

== Lineage ==
=== The Peel and Dufferin Regiment ===
- Originated on 14 September 1866 in Brampton, Ontario, as the 36th Peel Battalion of Infantry
- Redesignated on 8 May 1900 as the 36th Peel Regiment
- Redesignated on 1 May 1920 as The Peel Regiment
- Redesignated on 15 April 1923 as The Peel and Dufferin Regiment
- Amalgamated on 15 December 1936 with The Lorne Rifles (Scottish) and Redesignated as The Lorne Scots (Peel, Dufferin and Halton Regiment)

== Perpetuations ==
- 74th Battalion, CEF
- 126th Battalion (Peel), CEF
- 234th Battalion (Peel), CEF

The Peel Regiment had also been expected that it would also perpetuate the 20th Battalion, CEF, but some of its veterans could not come to an agreement on the project, so the regiment missed the opportunity to perpetuate a CEF battalion that had seen service in the field.

== History ==
=== Early history ===
With the passing of the Militia Act of 1855, the first of a number of newly raised independent militia companies were established in and around the Peel County region of Canada West (now the province of Ontario).

On 14 September 1866 the 36th Peel Battalion of Infantry was authorized for service by the regimentation of seven of these previously authorized independent militia rifle and infantry companies. Its Regimental Headquarters was at Brampton and had companies at Brampton, Orangeville, Albion, Streetsville, Alton, Grahamsville, Mono Mills, Tullamore and Sand Hill, Ontario.

=== The South African War & Early 1900s ===
During the Boer War, the regiment as a unit, did not go to war; however, many officers and other ranks from the regiment served there with the Canadian Contingents.

On 8 May 1900 the 36th Peel Battalion of Infantry was Reorganized and Redesignated as the 36th Peel Regiment.

=== The Great War ===
During the First World War, the 36th Peel Regiment as a unit was not mobilized but when the Canadian Expeditionary Force was raised in September 1914, drafts from various units were called up and formed into numbered battalions. The 36th Peel Regiment in particular contributed drafts to help form the 4th Battalion (Central Ontario), CEF as part of the First Canadian Contingent (later the 1st Canadian Division).

On 10 July 1915 the 74th Battalion, CEF was authorized for service and on 29 March 1916 the battalion embarked for Great Britain. After its arrival in the UK, the battalion provided reinforcements to the Canadian Corps in the field. On 30 September 1916 the battalion's personnel were absorbed by the 50th Battalion (Calgary), CEF; the 52nd Battalion (New Ontario), CEF and the 2nd Battalion, Canadian Mounted Rifles. On 15 September 1917 the 74th Battalion, CEF was disbanded.

On 22 December 1915 the 126th Battalion (Peel), CEF was authorized for service and on 14 August 1916 the battalion embarked for Great Britain. On 13 October 1916 the battalion's personnel were absorbed by the 109th Battalion (Victoria & Haliburton), CEF and the 116th Battalion (Ontario County), CEF to provide reinforcements to the Canadian Corps in the field. On 21 May 1917 the 126th Battalion, CEF was disbanded.

On 15 July 1916 the 234th Battalion (Peel), CEF was authorized for service and on 18 April 1917 the battalion embarked for Great Britain. After its arrival in the UK; on 30 April 1917 the battalion's personnel were absorbed by the 12th Reserve Battalion, CEF to provide reinforcements to the Canadian Corps in the field. On 1 September 1917 the 234th Battalion, CEF was disbanded.

=== 1920s–1930s ===
==== The Peel Regiment (1921–1923) ====
The county regiments, which had been by-passed during the First World War, were in dire need of revitalization. Lieutenant-Colonel McCausland, who had commanded the 74th Battalion, was appointed to command the 36th Peel Regiment in 1920.

On 15 March 1920 as a result of the Otter Commission and the following post-war reorganization of the militia, the 36th Peel Regiment was Redesignated as The Peel Regiment and was reorganized with 3 battalions (2 of them paper-only reserve battalions) to perpetuate the assigned war-raised battalions of the Canadian Expeditionary Force.

Some of the officers felt they would have to recruit from beyond the bounds of the county in order to be viable. The Headquarters, A and B Companies were in a large second-storey flat at the corner of Pacific and Dundas Streets in West Toronto; C Company was in Brampton and D Company in Port Credit. Some of the Toronto regiments had objected to this incursion, and in March 1922, the unit was directed that its officer personnel should reside within the recruiting area. McCausland, who lived in Toronto, resigned, as did numerous other officers. Major RV Conover, who had served with The Halton Rifles, but commanded the company in Brampton, where he now lived, was selected to succeed in command.

==== The Peel and Dufferin Regiment (1923–1936) ====
The Peel Regiment had had a presence in Dufferin County, in Orangeville and Shelburne. Perhaps the insistence on officers coming from the recruiting area led to the formal inclusion of Dufferin in the regimental title. On 15 April 1923 the regiment was Redesignated as The Peel and Dufferin Regiment and was authorized to draw from both counties. D Company was headquartered at Orangeville. Early that year the regiment had received permission from Sir Robert Peel (after whose family the county had been named), to use part of his personal crest as the regimental badge. The crest is 'a demi-lion rampant, gorged and collared, charged with three bezants, between the paws a shuttle'. (A bezant in heraldry is a gold roundel, and takes its name from the gold coins 'of Byzantium' which circulated in England in medieval times). The demi-lion was quickly incorporated into the design of the buttons, and in 1925 into the cap badge and collar badges of the new unit.

Annual training in 1925 was conducted at local headquarters; because of fiscal restraints, in three sessions of three days each. Lieutenant-Colonel Conover, who was now on the district staff, arranged a three-day musketry camp at Long Branch Rifle Ranges over Labour Day, introducing the idea of district training. The three regiments of the 25th Infantry Brigade who attended, however, had to pay for their own transportation and ration expenses. The training exercises now went beyond the drill and rifle practice of earlier days, and during the inter-war years involved attack and defensive positions, inter-arm co-operation (the artillery came out to the farmlands west of Brampton and demonstrated a smoke screen), ground to air signalling, and even aerial bombardment.

The colours of the old 36th Regiment had been laid up in Christ Church, Brampton in 1924, and the following year the Peel Chapter, Imperial Order Daughters of the Empire, presented a king's colour to The Peel and Dufferin Regiment. The county of Peel gave a grant in 1924 towards the purchase of a regimental colour, but its production was delayed pending a decision on the granting of battle honours to militia regiments. These battle honours would be assigned to The Peel and Dufferin Regiment in 1930.

The Department of National Defense approved the design for the regimental colour, incorporating these battle honours, and on 22 May 1930 the Governor General, Viscount Willingdon, presented the colour on behalf of the county council.

As a result of the 1936 Canadian Militia Reorganization, on 15 December 1936 The Peel and Dufferin Regiment was Amalgamated with The Lorne Rifles (Scottish) to form the present regiment, The Lorne Scots (Peel, Dufferin and Halton Regiment).

== Organization ==
=== 36th Peel Battalion of Infantry (14 September 1866) ===
- No. 1 Company (Brampton, Ontario) (first raised on 3 April 1856 as The Volunteer Militia Rifle Company of Brampton)
- No. 2 Company (Orangeville, Ontario) (first raised on 19 December 1862 as the Orangeville Infantry Company)
- No. 3 Company (Brampton, Ontario) (first raised on 2 January 1863 as the Brampton Infantry Company)
- No. 4 Company (Albion, Ontario) (first raised on 9 January 1863 as the Albion Infantry Company)
- No. 5 Company (Streetsville, Ontario) (first raised on 16 January 1863 as the Derry West Infantry Company)
- No. 6 Company (Alton, Ontario) (first raised on 16 January 1863 as the Alton Infantry Company)
- No. 7 Company (Grahamsville, Ontario) (first raised on 6 February 1863 as the Grahamsville Infantry Company)

=== The Peel Regiment (1 May 1920) ===
- A Company (West Toronto, ON)
- B Company (West Toronto, ON)
- C Company (Brampton, ON)
- D Company (Port Credit, ON)

=== The Peel Regiment (1 March 1921) ===
- 1st Battalion (perpetuating the 74th Battalion, CEF)
- 2nd (Reserve) Battalion (perpetuating the 126th Battalion, CEF)
- 3rd (Reserve) Battalion (perpetuating the 234th Battalion, CEF)

== Alliances ==
- United Kingdom - The Lancashire Fusiliers (1929–1936)

Major CM Corkett had served during the First World War as an officer with The Lancashire Fusiliers, and The Peel and Dufferin Regiment sought an alliance with that regiment. The negotiations went slowly because the 2nd Battalion, The Lancashire Fusiliers, were serving in India, but eventually they signified their favour and in November 1929 the unit was informed that the king approved of the alliance. To symbolize the link, permission was received to adopt the white facings of the Fusiliers.

== Battle honours ==
- Ypres, 1915, '17 (Note: Selected to be borne on colours and appointments)
- Festubert, 1915
- Somme, 1916
- Arras, 1917, '18
- Hill 70
- Amiens
- Hindenburg Line
- Pursuit to Mons

== Memorials ==
On Sunday, November 5, 1922, a memorial window was dedicated in the Church of the Epiphany on Queen Street, West Toronto to the 3,200 all ranks who had passed through the Peel Regiment from 1914 to 1918, and the five hundred who had given their lives.

== Bibliography ==
- For Our Heritage: A History of the Lorne Scots (Peel, Dufferin and Halton Regiment) by Richard Ruggle (2008)
- The Badges and Uniforms of the Lorne Scots (Peel, Dufferin and Halton Regiment) Over 2 Centuries: 1800–2000 by Colonel E. F. Conover (2000)
