= Lorne Scots (Peel, Dufferin and Halton Regiment) =

Military unit of the Canadian Army

The Lorne Scots (Peel, Dufferin and Halton Regiment)
- Regimental badge
- Active: 14 September 1866 – present
- Country: Canada
- Branch: Canadian Army
- Type: Line infantry
- Role: Light infantry
- Size: One battalion
- Part of: 32 Canadian Brigade Group
- Garrison/HQ: RHQ – Brampton, Ontario; Dufferin (Admin) Company – Brampton, Ontario; Campbell Coy – Oakville, Ontario; Campbell Coy – Brampton, Ontario; Campbell Coy – Georgetown, Ontario; Pipes & Drums Band – Georgetown, Ontario
- Motto: Air son ar duthchais (Scottish Gaelic for 'for our heritage')
- March: Quick: "The Campbells Are Coming"; Quick: "John Peel"
- Mascot: Wild boar
- Anniversaries: September 14, regimental birthday
- Engagements: South African War; World War I; World War II; UN Peacekeeping Operations; NATO Operations; War in Afghanistan/War on terror
- Battle honours: See #Battle honours
- Website: www.canada.ca/en/army/corporate/4-canadian-division/the-lorne-scots.html

Commanders
- Current commander: LCol Jason Kearney
- Colonel-in-Chief: Prince Edward, Duke of Kent
- Regimental Sergeant Major: CWO Dmitri Iassinovski
- Honorary Colonel: HCol Gary Love
- Honorary Lieutenant-Coloenl: HLCol Lori Duthie

Insignia
- Tartan: Ancient Ordinary Campbell
- Facings: White
- Hackle: Primrose
- Colours: Blue, grey and green

The Lorne Scots (Peel, Dufferin and Halton Regiment) is a Primary Reserve infantry regiment of the Canadian Army that is headquartered in Brampton, Ontario. It is part of the 4th Canadian Division's 32 Canadian Brigade Group. This kilted Lowland regiment was formed as an amalgamation in 1936 of two predecessor units that date back to 1866. The regiment is named for John Campbell, Marquis of Lorne (Governor General of Canada 1878–1883) and three Ontario counties: Peel County, Dufferin County, and Halton County. In the Second World War, the Lorne Scots mobilized nearly all the defence and employment units for the Canadian Army (Active).

== Organization ==
The sub-units of the Lorne Scots are in the following armouries:

- Regimental Headquarters (RHQ): Brampton, Ontario
- Dufferin Company (Admin Coy): Brampton and Georgetown, Ontario
- Campbell Company: Brampton, Oakville and Georgetown, Ontario
- Pipes and Drums (Dufferin Company): Georgetown

The regiment's commanding officer is Lieutenant-Colonel Jason Kearney. The regimental sergeant major is Chief Warrant Officer Dmitri Iassinovski.

The Lorne Scots deployed a great number of units in World War II as headquarters defence and employment platoons, and since 1945 have had many soldiers deploy as individual augmentees to overseas missions tasked with peacemaking operations in the Middle East, Golan Heights, Namibia, Cambodia, Cyprus, the Former Yugoslavia and Afghanistan.

== Lineage ==
1991–2023 regimental colour

Camp flag

=== The Lorne Scots (Peel, Dufferin and Halton Regiment) ===
The Lorne Scots (Peel, Dufferin and Halton Regiment) originated in Brampton, Canada West, on 14 September 1866, as the 36th "Peel Battalion of Infantry". It was redesignated as the 36th Peel Regiment on 8 May 1900, as the Peel Regiment on 1 May 1920 and The Peel and Dufferin Regiment on 15 April 1923. On 15 December 1936, it was amalgamated with the Lorne Rifles (Scottish) and redesignated The Lorne Scots (Peel, Dufferin and Halton Regiment).

=== The Lorne Rifles (Scottish) ===
The Lorne Rifles (Scottish) originated in Milton, Canada West, on 28 September 1866, as the 20th "Halton Battalion of Infantry". It was redesignated the 20th "Halton" Battalion of Rifles on 12 January 1872, as the 20th Halton Battalion "Lorne Rifles" on 11 November 1881, as the 20th Halton Regiment "Lorne Rifles" on 8 May 1900, as the 20th Regiment, Halton Rifles on 1 December 1909, as The Halton Rifles on 1 May 1920 and The Lorne Rifles (Scottish) on 1 November 1931. On 15 December 1936, it was amalgamated with the Peel and Dufferin Regiment.

=== Chart ===
Lineage chart

1856	Independent coys of rifles and infy
1861	Independent coys of rifles and infy
1866	36th "Peel Bn of Infy"	20th "Halton Bn of Infy"
1872	20th "Halton" Bn of Rifles
1881	20th Halton Bn "Lorne Rifles"
1900	36th Peel Regt	20th Halton Regt "Lorne Rifles"
1909	20th Regt, Halton Rifles
1914	37th Bn, CEF
1915	74th "Overseas" Bn, CEF	126th "Overseas" Bn, CEF	76th "Overseas" Bn, CEF	164th "Overseas" Bn, CEF
1916	Absorbed by 50th and 52nd "Overseas" Bn and 2nd CMR Bn	Absorbed by 109th and 116th "Overseas" Bn	234th "Overseas" Bn	Absorbed by 39th "Overseas" Bn	Absorbed by 36th "Overseas" Bn
1917	Absorbed by the '12th Reserve Bn, CEF
1918	Absorbed by 8th Reserve Bn
1920	1st Bn (20th Bn, CEF), The Peel Regt	2nd Bn (74th Bn, CEF), (Note: Reserve) The Peel Regt	3rd Bn (126th Bn, CEF), The Peel Regt	4th Bn (234th Bn, CEF), The Peel Regt	1st Bn (37th Bn, CEF), The Halton Rifles	2nd Bn (76th Bn, CEF), The Halton Rifles	3rd Bn (164th Bn, CEF), The Halton Rifles
1921	1st Bn, The Peel Regt
1921	1st Bn (74th Bn, CEF), The Peel Regt	2nd Bn (126th Bn, CEF), The Peel Regt	3rd Bn (234th Bn, CEF), The Peel Regt	Disbanded
1923	1st Bn (74th Bn, CEF), The Peel and Dufferin Regt	2nd Bn (126th Bn, CEF), The Peel and Dufferin Regt	3rd Bn (234th Bn, CEF), The Peel and Dufferin Regt
1931	1st Bn (37th Bn, CEF), The Lorne Rifles (Scottish)	2nd Bn (76th Bn, CEF), The Lorne Rifles (Scottish)	3rd Bn (164th Bn, CEF), The Lorne Rifles (Scottish)
1936	Disbanded	Disbanded	Disbanded	Disbanded
1936	The Lorne Scots (Peel, Dufferin and Halton Regt)
1939	No. 1 Infy Base Depot, CASF
1940	Disbanded	No. 1 Canadian Base Depot, CASF	2nd (Reserve) Bn, The Lorne Scots (Peel, Dufferin and Halton Regt)
1941	1st Bn, The Lorne Scots (Peel, Dufferin and Halton Regt), CASF
1944	Disbanded
1947	Disbanded	The Lorne Scots (Peel, Dufferin and Halton Regt)

== Perpetuations ==
The Lorne Scots perpetuate the 37th Battalion (Northern Ontario), CEF, the 74th Battalion, CEF, the 76th Battalion, CEF, the 126th Battalion (Peel), CEF, the 164th Battalion (Halton and Dufferin), CEF, and the 234th Battalion (Peel), CEF. The regiment also carries battle honours from the 2nd Regiment of York Militia and the 4th Battalion, CEF.

== Badges ==
=== Cap badge ===
The old cap badge of the Lorne Scots used in until 2016.

Blazon: Issuant from a torse Argent and Azure a demi-lion Argent gorged with a collar Azure charged with a frieze of bezants, holding between its paws a shuttle Or, all ensigned by the Royal Crown proper and within a wreath of maple leaves Argent and thistles proper, issuant from two scrolls Sable inscribed AIR SON AR DUTHCHAIS and THE LORNE SCOTS (PEEL, DUFFERIN AND HALTON REGT) in letters Argent.

The cap badge was changed in 2016 to more closely resemble the image appearing on the regiment's Colour. The demi lion, originally appearing in gold, is now silver. The shuttlecock, once silver, has been replaced with gold.

=== Collar badge ===
The Chief of the Clan Campbell, the Duke of Argyll granted the Lorne Rifles (Scottish), permission to wear his crest in 1931. This crest is blazoned "a Boar's head erased". The boar's head is worn on the coatie collar on the Number 1 Regimental Uniform. It is worn midway down the jacket on the number two mess dress. It is also worn on the jacket collar on the Number Three Service Dress.

== History ==
On 14 September 1866 the 36th Peel Battalion was authorized and on 28 September the 20th Halton Battalion of Infantry was formed. These regiments were two of the early Canadian Militia regiments. These two regiments, some 70 years later, were reorganized to form the Lorne Scots (Peel, Dufferin and Halton Regiment).

The first Scottish connection was made on 27 September 1879 when the Halton Rifles were reviewed by the Marquis of Lorne and permission was received in 1881 to re-designate the 20th Halton Rifles as the 20th Halton Battalion Lorne Rifles. In addition, the wearing of tartan trews and the diced Glengarry were authorized and a pipe band was formed.

=== First World War ===
The 37th Battalion (Northern Ontario), CEF, was authorized on 7 November 1914 and embarked for Great Britain on 27 November 1915, where it provided reinforcements to the Canadian Corps in the field until 9 July 1916, when its personnel were absorbed by the 39th Battalion, CEF. The battalion was disbanded on 21 May 1917.

The 74th Battalion, CEF, was authorized on 10 July 1915 and embarked for Great Britain on 29 March 1916, where it provided reinforcements to the Canadian Corps in the field until 30 September 1916, when its personnel were absorbed by the 50th Battalion (Calgary), CEF, 52nd Battalion (New Ontario), CEF, and the 2nd Battalion, Canadian Mounted Rifles, CEF. The battalion was disbanded on 15 September 1917.

The commanding officer of the 36th Peel Regiment, Lieutenant-Colonel Windeyer, was disappointed that the county regiments would not serve as units. When the 74th Battalion was authorized in June 1915, however, he agreed to raise it, assisted by the company commander from Orangeville, Major A.J. McCausland. It drew mainly from Peel county, which contributed 26 officers and 346 other ranks, but also from the 48th Highlanders, the Queen's Own Rifles and the 10th Royal Grenadiers of Toronto. The battalion trained at Niagara Camp before moving to winter quarters at the Toronto Exhibition. Before leaving Canada, reinforcement drafts were drawn from it. Windeyer was seconded to headquarters staff, and McCausland promoted to command. At the end of March 1916, the unit embarked on the Empress of Britain. It was broken up to reinforce existing units of the Canadian Corps in France. McCausland served with the 75th Battalion of the 4th Canadian Division, and though he commanded it for a period, ill health prevented him from succeeding when the commanding officer was killed in action. In 1924 the colours of the 74th Battalion were deposited in Christ Church, Brampton.

The 76th Battalion, CEF, was authorized on 10 July 1915 and embarked for Great Britain on 23 April 1916, where it provided reinforcements to the Canadian Corps in the field until 6 July 1916, when its personnel were absorbed by the 36th Battalion, CEF. The battalion was disbanded on 17 July 1917.

The 76th Battalion, with an establishment of 1,153, was raised from fifteen militia units of the second divisional area, outside of Toronto, including the Halton Rifles and the Dufferin Rifles of Canada. A former officer of the Halton Rifles, Major J. Ballantine, was chosen to command. Ballantine had been awarded the Distinguished Service Order while serving with the 4th Battalion, CEF, and was home on sick leave. The Halton Rifles contributed one officer and 98 other ranks to the 76th Battalion. The 76th mobilized in Camp Niagara on 30 July 1915. On November 5 the battalion moved into winter quarters at Barrie, with A Company in Collingwood and B Company in Orillia. A draft of 255 all ranks left for overseas 30 September 1915, and other drafts followed. Route marches and other intensive training were carried out during the winter months. The battalion moved overseas only to be broken up to supply reinforcements for other units in the field.

The 126th Battalion (Peel), CEF, was authorized on 22 December 1915 and embarked for Great Britain on 14 August 1916, where, on 13 October 1916, its personnel were absorbed by the 109th (Victoria & Haliburton) Battalion, CEF, and the 116th Battalion (Ontario County), CEF, to provide reinforcements to the Canadian Corps in the field. The battalion was disbanded on 21 May 1917.

On 12 November 1915, the 36th Peel Regiment was authorized to recruit the 126th Battalion, Canadian Expeditionary Force. Major FJ Hamilton of Port Credit was made temporary lieutenant-colonel, and oversaw an intensive recruiting campaign throughout the winter. By spring the battalion was up to strength – over a thousand men, with 32 officers.

The new two-company armoury in Brampton, built in 1912, was utilized as quarters, as was an old school in the west end of Toronto. Early in the summer of 1916 this unit was concentrated at Niagara Camp, later moving to Camp Borden, the large new camp, just completed in Simcoe County. On 16 August it embarked for overseas. This battalion had expected to go to the front as a unit, but the severe casualties suffered by the Canadians during the battle of the Somme made it necessary to break up the unit for reinforcements. 450 men transferred to the 109th Battalion; the band and 350 men joined the 116th Battalion.

The regimental march of the 126th, "John Peel", was later adopted by the Peel and Dufferin Regiment.

The 164th Battalion (Halton and Dufferin), CEF was authorized on 22 December 1915 and embarked for Great Britain on 11 April 1917, where it provided reinforcements to the Canadian Corps in the field until 16 April 1918, when its personnel were absorbed by the 8th Reserve Battalion, CEF. The battalion was disbanded on 29 November 1918.

The 164th Battalion commenced recruiting on January 1, 1916, in the counties of Halton and Dufferin, with its headquarters in Milton, the county town of Halton. Brisk recruiting had brought the battalion up to a strength of about 800 men by the end of March, but it never reached full strength. The battalion was split up into small detachments scattered through the recruiting area until June 5, when it was mobilized at Orangeville, remaining there under canvas until July 2, when it was moved to Camp Borden. On October 29 the battalion commenced a route march from Camp Borden to Hamilton, a distance of about 150 miles (240 km), to take up winter quarters in the Westinghouse Barracks. In February 1917 it was augmented by a draft of 250 men from the 205th Tiger Battalion, although transfers and discharges brought its strength down to about 750 by the time it arrive in England. It became part of the 5th Canadian Division. Eventually the 164th was broken up as reinforcements for Canadian units already in France.

During the stay in Hamilton, the ladies of Halton and Dufferin counties presented the battalion with a set of colours, presented by Sir John Hendrie in the armoury in Hamilton. These colours were subsequently deposited in Saint Jude's Church, Oakville, for safekeeping.

The 234th Battalion (Peel), CEF, was authorized on 15 July 1916 and embarked for Great Britain on 18 April 1917, where, on 30 April 1917, its personnel were absorbed by the 12th Reserve Battalion, CEF, to provide reinforcements to the Canadian Corps in the field. The battalion was disbanded on 1 September 1917.

Lieutenant-Colonel Wellington Wallace was brought out of retirement to raise another Peel battalion, the 234th, authorized in April 1916. The Peel recruiting ground was being depleted, after raising so many drafts and the entire 126th, and special efforts were needed to attract men. In December, a ministerial Patriotic Association urged sermons in every church in the county to plead the need for additional recruits. They also discussed what influence the attitude of the Russelites (Jehovah's Witnesses) might have, because of their refusal to enlist. In March, when 490 men had been raised, one newspaper remarked:

One of the officers closely connected with recruiting declares that the sons of farmers in Peel are not doing their fair share, as he knows fully 150 who can be spared from the farms to work in munitions plants, but do not show any disposition to enlist. He states further that there are several instances where four or five unmarried sons are living on large pasture farms of from two to 300 acres (1.2 km^{2}) and who are not needed at home.

The unit also issued a 28-page illustrated pamphlet, "setting forth the work, the experiences, the adventures and aspirations of the Battalion", sold at ten cents a copy by the officers and through the schools. The unit trained at Niagara Camp, and sent off reinforcement drafts. Wallace was too old for active service, and Major WO Morris took the battalion overseas. It embarked from Halifax on the steamship SS Scandinavian (2) with 15 officers and 279 other ranks. In England, the 234th was absorbed by the 12th Reserve Battalion.

In addition to the CEF units that the Lorne Scots perpetuate, the 36th Peel Regiment and the 20th Halton Rifles provided 16 officers and 404 other ranks to the 4th Battalion of the 1st Canadian Division, the detachment from the 36th Peel Regiment were incorporated in B Company, and other members of the regiment served in various battalion appointments. Subsequently, many more men from the two regiments were allotted to the 20th Battalion (Central Ontario), CEF (three officers and 100 other ranks), 36th Battalion, CEF (four officers and 237 other ranks ), 58th Battalion, CEF, and 81st Battalion, CEF.

=== Inter-war years ===
==== The Peel and Dufferin Regiment ====
Peel Regiment (1921–1923)

The county regiments, which had been by-passed during the First World War, were in dire need of revitalization. Lieutenant-Colonel McCausland, who had commanded the 74th Battalion, was appointed to command the 36th Peel Regiment in 1920, and the regiment was disbanded and reorganized as the Peel Regiment. Some of the officers felt they would have to recruit from beyond the bounds of the county in order to be viable, and the Headquarters, A and B companies were in a large second-storey flat at the corner of Pacific and Dundas Streets in West Toronto; C Company was in Brampton and D Company in Port Credit. Some of the Toronto regiments had objected to this incursion, and in March 1922, the unit was directed that its officer personnel should reside within the recruiting area. McCausland, who lived in Toronto, resigned, as did numerous other officers. Major RV Conover, who had served with the Halton Rifles, but commanded the company in Brampton, where he now lived, was selected to succeed in command.

The regiment perpetuated the 74th, 126th and 234th Battalions, CEF. [69th Bn?] It could have been expected that it would also perpetuate the 20th, but some of its veterans could not come to an agreement on the project, so the regiment missed the opportunity to perpetuate a CEF battalion that had seen service in the field.

On Sunday, November 5, 1922, a memorial window was dedicated in the Church of the Epiphany on Queen Street, West Toronto, to the 3200 all ranks who had passed through the Peel Regiment from 1914 to 1918, and the five hundred who had given their lives.

The Peel and Dufferin Regiment (1923–1936)

The Peel Regiment had had a presence in Dufferin county, in Orangeville and Shelburne. Perhaps the insistence on officers coming from the recruiting area led to the formal inclusion of Dufferin in the regimental title. In 1923 The Peel and Dufferin Regiment was authorized to draw from both counties. D Company was headquartered at Orangeville. Early that year the regiment had received permission from Sir Robert Peel (after whose family the county had been named) to use part of his crest as a regimental badge. The crest is a demi-lion rampant, gorged and collared, charged with three bezants, between the paws a shuttle (a bezant in heraldry is a gold roundel, and takes its name from the gold coins 'of Byzantium' which circulated in England in medieval times). The demi-lion was quickly incorporated into the design of the buttons, and in 1925 of the cap badge and collar badges of the new unit.

Annual training in 1925 was conducted at local headquarters, because of fiscal restraints, in three sessions of three days each. Lieutenant-Colonel Conover, who was now on district staff, arranged a three-day musketry camp at Long Branch Rifle Ranges over Labour Day, introducing the idea of district training. The three regiments of the 25th Infantry Brigade who attended, however, had to pay for their own transportation and ration expenses. The training exercises now went beyond the drill and rifle practice of earlier days, and during the inter-war years involved attack and defensive positions, inter-arm co-operation (the artillery came out to the farmlands west of Brampton and demonstrated a smoke screen), ground to air signalling, and even aerial bombardment.

The colours of the old 36th Regiment had been laid up in Christ Church, Brampton, in 1924, and the following year the Peel Chapter, Imperial Order Daughters of the Empire, presented a king's colour to the Peel and Dufferin Regiment. The county of Peel gave a grant in 1924 towards the purchase of a regimental colour, but its production was delayed pending a decision on the granting of battle honours to militia regiments. The Department of National Defence approved the design for the regimental colour, incorporating these battle honours, and on 22 May 1930 the Governor-General, Viscount Willingdon, presented the colour on behalf of the county council.

Major CM Corkett had served during the First World War as an officer with the Lancashire Fusiliers, and the Peel and Dufferin Regiment sought an alliance with that regiment. The negotiations went slowly because the 2nd Battalion of the Lancashire Fusiliers were serving in India, but eventually they signified their favour and in November 1929 the unit was informed that the king approved of the alliance. To symbolize the link, permission was received to adopt the white facings of the Fusiliers.

==== The Lorne Rifles (Scottish) ====
The Halton Rifles was reorganized as the Lorne Rifles (Scottish) in 1931 and permission was received from Niall Campbell, 10th Duke of Argyll, the senior duke of Scotland, to use his personal crest, the boar's head and his personal tartan, the Ordinary Campbell. On 15 December 1936, following a general reorganization of the Militia, the Lorne Rifles and the Peel and Dufferin Regiment were amalgamated to form the present regiment, The Lorne Scots (Peel, Dufferin and Halton Regiment).

=== World War II ===
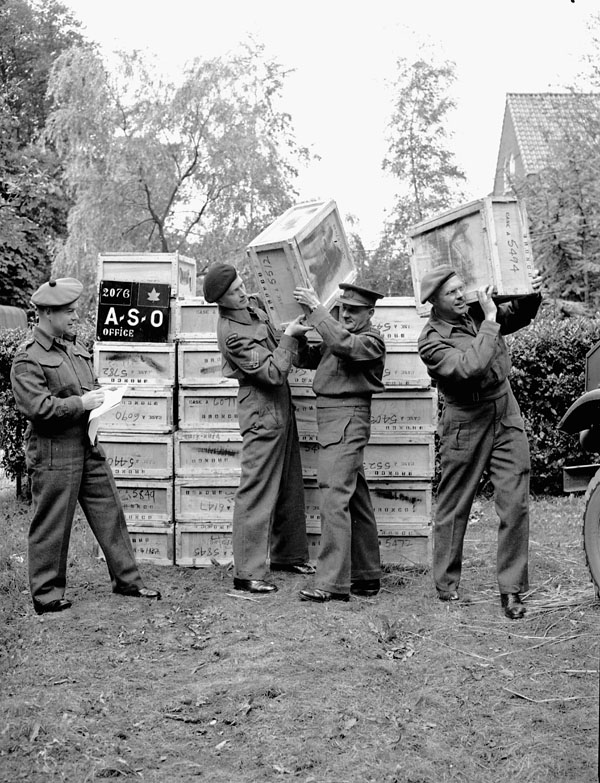
Delivery of 500,000 free cigarettes from the Overseas Tobacco League to the 5th Canadian Armoured Division, Groningen, Netherlands; (L-R): Captain J.F. Yeddeay, Lorne Scots; Senior Supervisor W.R. Blythman and Supervisor R.R. Jacks, both of Canadian Legion Auxiliary Services

==== No. 1 Canadian Base Depot, CASF ====
The Lorne Scots (Peel, Dufferin and Halton Regiment) mobilized the No. 1 Infantry Base Depot, CASF, for active service on 1 September 1939. This unit was disbanded in England on 11 July 1940, following the formation of the No. 1 Canadian Base Depot on 1 May 1940 as the No. 1 Canadian General Base Depot, CASF. It was re-designated No. 1 Canadian Base Depot, CASF, the same day. It was stationed in Liverpool, England for the convenience of disembarkation and embarkation of Canadian soldiers. The depot was disbanded on 18 July 1944.

As the outbreak of hostilities approached during the summer of 1939, the CO of the Lorne Scots, Lieutenant-Colonel Louis Keene, was offered the opportunity to mobilize an infantry battalion for the 3rd Canadian Division, if and when Canada decided to mobilize three divisions. Rather than wait for this remote possibility, he accepted the alternative of organizing a minor but immediately required unit, No. 1 Infantry Base Depot, CASF (Canadian Active Service Force). While guards were being mounted on the armouries in Brampton, Georgetown, Port Credit, Milton, Oakville, Acton, Orangeville and Shelburne, the Lorne Scots set about forming the headquarters and two companies of the Depot, with two provost sections.

CASF units were distinct from the units of the NPAM (Non-Permanent Active Militia), even when they bore the same name. But they drew from the experience of those units, in the officers and NCOs who volunteered to serve in them.

For three and a half months the unit trained in Brampton, where it graduated 200 cooks. In mid-December it moved to the Automotive Building on the Toronto Exhibition Grounds for a month, before setting out to embark from Halifax for Britain. Here they were at first located at Farnborough, in Barossa barracks.

On the eve of the fall of France, the War Cabinet resolved to send every available division, including the 1st Canadian Infantry Division, to Brittany in a forlorn hope of stemming the German advance. An advance party from the Depot – Major W.H. Lent, CSM E Ching and Corporal Hiscock – went to establish a base depot at Isse near Chateaubriand. On their arrival, the expeditionary force heard of the surrender of Paris, and started to return. Major Lent's party, who had set foot on French soil on June 12, were back in Barossa Barracks by the 18th.

In mid-March 1941 the unit moved to Liverpool, to be near the principal embarkation and disembarkation ports used by Canadians. They were housed at Seaforth Barracks, about four miles (6 km) from the centre of the city, and a few hundred yards from the waterfront. Just as they were arriving in their new quarters, the air raid sirens sounded. Liverpool and the other towns along the Mersey estuary would suffer the heaviest raids in Britain, outside London. Things were then relatively quiet for a month, and the broken glass of the barracks was replaced by tar paper. In mid-April incendiaries landed on the barracks building, but were extinguished before any harm was done. Then in one week in May, over 2,000 bombs were dropped and 1,500 people killed. Many of the soldiers at the depot were men of low medical category awaiting return to Canada, but they volunteered to work throughout the night, night after night. Fires raged through the docks and warehouses; the sky was full of bursting ack-ack shells; flares dropped by enemy planes were floating slowly toward the earth, lighting up everything in the vicinity; bright red tracer bullets streaked across the sky, aimed at the flares in an attempt to extinguish them; the city seemed ablaze. Planes droned continuously overhead; bombs screeched on their way to the targets, and exploded as they landed; guns roared; and workers shouted hoarsely as they tried to communicate with each other. To the sights and sounds were added the smells of explosive and burning wood.

Captain D.C. Heggie, RCAMC, the depot's medical officer, spent the night of 3/4 May under fire amid bombs and falling masonry, binding up wounds and relieving suffering. He forced his way into demolished buildings, directed rescue operations and at times crawled into cellars to administer hypodermics to trapped and wounded civilians. Once he was lowered head-first into the basement of a wrecked dwelling to give morphine to a badly crushed civilian pinned in the ruins. For his 'conspicuous gallantry' on that night, he was awarded the George Medal. Early on 7 May, a land mine was dropped near the first aid post, injuring Captain Heggie in the head. Although bleeding profusely, he dragged himself to the injured nursing sisters and pulled them clear of the wreckage, and helped bandage their wounds. Then loss of blood forced him to give in, and the following day he was evacuated to a Canadian military hospital.

The soldiers helped civil defence workers remove dead and injured from ruined houses, comforted wounded civilians, helped to extinguish fires, drove supply trucks and acted as guards and traffic guides.

==== Defence and employment ====
The regiment subsequently mobilized the 1st Battalion, The Lorne Scots (Peel, Dufferin and Halton Regiment), CASF for active service on 6 February 1941, to "provide personnel and reinforcements for all 'Defence and Employment' requirements of the Canadian Army. As a result, numerous Lorne Scots defence and employment units served in the Mediterranean, North-West Europe and Canada. The overseas battalion was disbanded on 21 February 1947, when its last unit, No. 1 Non- Effective Transit Depot, CASF was disbanded.

==== Dieppe ====
At Dieppe, No. 6 Defence Platoon (6th Canadian Infantry Brigade) were brought by LST (Landing Ship Tank), touching down on White Beach at 16:05 on 19 August 1942. It was split into two parts. CSM Irvine, with Privates Breault[?], Dubois, Rosenberger and Seed waded ashore with Brigadier Southern – all were reported missing. Lieutenant E.J. Norris, with Privates Hancock, Lane, Moor and Keith Spence accompanied the brigade major and signals. Their LST carried three Churchill tanks from the Calgary Regiment and a signal cart. The tanks were to lead off and clear an area to set up the headquarters. Spence was to engage enemy aircraft, but had no tracers so could not observe his fire, and ran out of ammunition since the craft carrying the stores had been hit. Most if his group were dead or wounded, and when a serviceable craft came alongside, he helped Hancock, Moore and Lane on board. As they pulled away, the LST that had brought them in sank. The Germans concentrated their fire on the craft in the water, leaving those on the shore until later, and the group pulled many soldiers of the Fusiliers Mont-Royal from the water. On the return to Newhaven, the platoon commander and Privates Lane and Hancock were sent to hospital.

Corporal Larry Guator, with Privates McDougall and Stephen Prus, were to act as bodyguard for Brigadier Leth (4th Canadian Infantry Brigade). They landed on Red Beach at 05:50. Prus was beside the brigadier when the latter was wounded in the arm, and carried him on a stretcher to the evacuation craft. Ashore, they fought until 13:00, when they were ordered to retreat.

==== Headquarters First Canadian Army, Defence Company (Lorne Scots) ====
By 1942, the Canadian military presence in Britain had grown; in that year a 4th division and second armoured division would arrive. Crerar felt there were too many to be a single corps, and proposed a First Canadian Army divided into two corps, each of two divisions and an armoured division. The field army headquarters would deal with administrative concerns, freeing the corps commanders to train fighting formations. On 6 April the Headquarters First Canadian Army came into being, and the Headquarters First Canadian Army, Defence Company (Lorne Scots) was established to protect it. Commanded by Captain V.G.H. Phillips, it consisted of six officers and 160 other ranks. It had the task of guarding Headley Court, the stately home near Leatherhead, Surrey, where the corps headquarters had been located. It was a serious business: much time was spent training (there were sessions on aircraft recognition, and on drills in case of gas attack) and on the ranges; once a sergeant was accidentally wounded by a Sten gun; and on one occasion a soldier was court-martialed for sleeping on his post as a sentry.

The officers of the units were frequently called to assist at the many courts-martial that took place at the headquarters. The men provided guards of honour when the Minister of National Defence, J.L. Ralston, visited. They were often congratulated by General Andrew McNaughton for their deportment on the march past after the monthly church parade (services were voluntary on the other Sundays, but a soldier had to inform the orderly sergeant if he wanted to attend).

Almost every issue of daily orders included a section entitled 'Punishments', mostly for being absent without leave, which brought loss of pay and confinement to barracks. The shortages of wartime Britain were also reflected in the orders: the wasting of bread was to cease forthwith, and the orderly sergeant was to take the names of men who left bread on the table. When this measure failed to correct the situation, the men were restricted to half a slice of bread at a time. After exercises, the headquarters received complaints of men shooting game with service rifles. And the arrival of 20,000 American cigarettes for resale to the troops was an occurrence of such importance that it was recorded in the war diary.

The company was disbanded in April 1944, when its duties were taken over by the Royal Montreal Regiment.

==== Italy ====
The Canadian government was sensitive to public criticism that its troops were standing too long on guard duty in Britain, and Canadian commanders wished their troops to gain some battle experience. That came with the invasion of Sicily in July 1943, by British, Canadian and American forces; the 1st Canadian Infantry Division and the First Canadian Army Tank Brigade were part of General Bernard Montgomery's force.

McNaughton had committed Canadians to Sicily only for battle experience, and had not planned to break up the army he had forged for the last great battle in Europe. But Ottawa had agreed, not only to leave the Canadians already there in the campaign, but to augment them with the 5th Canadian Armoured Division and I Canadian Corps Headquarters.

On 26 October 1943, the Edmund B. Alexander pulled out of Gourock with 4700 troops, including the Headquarters I Canadian Corps and its Defence Company. The men had thought that they were going on an exercise, and as the ship joined a convoy of 24, they realised they were going into action, although even on the voyage they were unsure of their destination. It was in Sicily, at Augusta, that the Alexander disembarked, the men going ashore in landing craft.

The company took over a defensive position from the Seaforth Highlanders of Canada, three miles (5 km) north of Ortona, from 15 to 27 February 1944. The men immediately began taking part in the constant patrolling that sought out information from the enemy – the Lornes augmenting the more experienced Seaforths. On the 18th, Corporal Tost and two other volunteers joined a fighting patrol that was to try to take a prisoner. They studied the objective on aerial photographs – a group of houses that the Germans were thought to occupy during the night.

The fighting patrol passed through one of our standing patrols ... and made its way down into the valley, moving very quietly and in bounds. We stopped very often to listen as it was so dark we had difficulty in keeping the man in front in view. We crossed the bottom of the valley and started into enemy territory. Movement was very difficult due to trip wires, dry bamboo and the darkness. Everyone was extremely tense and our trigger fingers never left their correct positions. After crossing the valley we went to ground and travelled snake fashion for 200 or 300 yd (270 m). There was no time to worry about ourselves now because we were working as a Team and each man had a job to do .... Jerry kept up his steady flow of illuminating flares and every time one went up there were 17 living statues out in no-man's land. At 3- or 4-minute intervals Jerry let go with a burst of tracer from his fixed lines of fire and some came uncomfortably close. We advanced as far as a small stream just inside Jerry lines and remained there for some time listening and then crossed it in small groups. We heard some movement that sounded like several men in a group and moving in the direction of our objective. We moved to a position with 70 yd (64 m) of our objective and flares were now landing within a few feet of us. There was very little M.G. fire at this time.... It was clear that Jerry was trying to draw us into his cross-fire. ... we learned that we had followed a Jerry patrol right up to our objective.

Company Sergeant Major TR Steen had the job of keeping the troops of the front line supplied with ammunition and rum. On one occasion the sergeant major brought the rum through under shell fire to his quarters. Waiting for the shell fire to cease, "he boldly uncorked the bottle and repeatedly assured himself that the quality of the rum was up to the standard required for his men."

In May 1944, the two Ack Ack [Anti-Aircraft] platoons were becoming familiar with new Oerlikon 20 mm cannons. In July, a Lorne Scot concentration was held, then Major Drennan admitted to 5th Canadian CGS; he was found to have serious injury to his spinal column, and on 3 August Major S. Beatty assumed command. During the summer, the prisoner of war cage was only lightly used, mostly for Italian refugees; during the fierce fighting of September, this changed, the busiest day being the 13th (the date of the capture of Coriano Ridge on the Rimini Line), when two German officers and 130 other ranks were admitted.

Daily orders required Canadians to remove the insignia that identified their nationality. It was felt that the presence of Canadians heralded an offensive, and commanders took the double step of trying to disguise an imminent attack on the Gothic Line, and by sending the 1st Canadian division to Florence, where the Americans were making diversionary preparations, before sending it to a more active part of the front.

In mid-January 1945, Major Beatty was made responsible for the defence of Ravenna and would become garrison commander in event of attack or stand-to. The front had become static for the winter, on a line along the rivers Senio and Seno approximately 10 miles (16 km) from the city.

With Italy secured, the Canadians began in February 1945, in great secrecy to move to north-western Europe. The I Canadian Corps moved to Marseille, then Antwerp, and on 15 March took over the Nijmegen area in the Netherlands.

In northern Italy, defence platoons were reorganized 24–5 February 1944 for the 1st, 2nd and 3rd Canadian Infantry Brigades, in the last instance by posting the 3rd Canadian Infantry Brigade support group intact to the Lorne Scots. During April and May they faced the Hitler Line.

==== Home defence ====
Japanese activity on the Pacific coast in 1942 provoked great fears of invasion. In February, a submarine shelled California, and on 20 June, two other submarines fired on Oregon and on an isolated wireless station on Vancouver Island. Although almost no damage was done, it was the only time in either world war that enemy shells fell on Canadian soil. On June 6–7, the Japanese occupied the two Aleutian islands of Attu and Kiska. There was little likelihood that the mainland would be invaded, but there was enormous fear that it would be. In March the War Committee approved the completion of the 7th Canadian Infantry Division and formation of the brigade groups of the 8th, for home defence. The 6th and 8th Divisions were disposed in Pacific Command; the 7th later was sent as a general reserve for the Atlantic Command.

No. 6 Defence and Employment Platoon for the 6th Canadian Division was authorized in March 1942, and recruited in Brampton, Georgetown, Oakville, Orangeville and Port Credit. During the organizational period, because of lack of facilities, the troops were put on subsistence of $1.00 a day. In mid-May training began at 20 CA(B)TC Brantford and at Camp Niagara. Trained personnel were posted to the new brigade defence platoons, and in September one officer and 28 other ranks moved to Work Point barracks in Victoria. Recruits were constantly being posted in, and trained soldiers posted out. In May 1943, fully trained active personnel were transferred to depot for proceeding overseas, and partially trained sent to infantry training centres to complete training prior to going overseas. Fifteen of the new recruits who arrived the next month were National Resources Mobilization Act (NRMA) men, who had been conscripted for service in Canada. In October, the platoon was in Prince George, BC.

Late in 1944, the need to free fit men for duty overseas was becoming desperate, and the need for coastal defence had abated. Cabinet approved the disbandment of the 6th Division, so that one infantry brigade group and two infantry brigades could be drawn from it. The government also decided to send 16,000 NRMA men overseas. The decision sparked a demonstration by about 200–300 NRMA men in Prince George, although none from the division's defence and employment platoon took part. For a few days, there were demonstrations at several camps along the coast. The divisional headquarters ceased to exist on 2 December, and its defence and employment platoon was disbanded on 31 January 1945.

=== Postwar ===
Since the Second World War, the regiment has been well represented at all military functions and in 1955 had the largest attendance at summer camp of any infantry regiment in Canada. In autumn of 1963, the regiment was presented with its Colours by the Lieutenant-Governor of Ontario, William Earl Rowe, in a ceremony at Caledon. This was followed by an upsurge of interest and prowess in marksmanship in the unit which immediately began to dominate competition shooting at all levels from local to national. This domination has continued to the present time with the unit being represented at various world Championships, Olympics, Pan-American Games and the Bisley Competition in England.

In the 1960s, the Lancashire Fusiliers, the allied regiment in England since 9 May 1929, suffered amalgamation and in the process bestowed its revered primrose hackle on the Lorne Scots for custodianship. It is now worn proudly on the headdress of all Lorne Scots infantry personnel. With the coming of the 1970s, the role of the Militia expanded, resulting in some Lorne Scots members serving in Germany.

The regiment's first-ever colonel-in-chief, Field Marshal Prince Edward, Duke of Kent visited the regiment in 1979 and 1983 and presented the unit with a new regimental and Queen's colour on 14 September 1991 in Brampton on the occasion of the regiment's 125th birthday.

The regiment has also provided troops to many of the United Nations peacemaking forces that Canada has contributed to. These include Golan Heights, Namibia, Cambodia, Cyprus and, most recently, the Former Yugoslavia. A number of troops participated in the clean up of activities during the 1998 Ice Storm in eastern Ontario, and Sovereignty Operation Nanook in the Canadian Arctic throughout 2007–2010. Soldiers from the regiment also participated in the Security Perimeter for the 2010 G20 Toronto Leaders Summit under the Royal Canadian Mounted Police led Integrated Security Unit, however, did not interact with protests or protesters during the Summit.

The regiment would send a platoon of soldiers to Nunavut with 31 Canadian Brigade Group as part of Exercise Trillium Response in 2014. Later in 2014. RHQ and soldiers of the regiment would form the basis for a battle group under the command of the 110th Maneuver Enhancement Brigade (US Army) in South Dakota as part of the National Guard Exercise Golden Coyote.

The regiment visited their allied regiment, The Royal Regiment of Fusiliers in 2012 and 2018 and took part in a City of London Privilege Parade to mark the Fusiliers 50th Anniversary.

The Colonel-in-Chief once again visited the regiment in 2016 to take part in the regiment's 150th birthday which included a Trooping of the Colours and dedication of Regimental monuments in Brampton, Georgetown, and Oakville. A regimental monument was added in Orangeville in 2018. The regiment more recently has contributed soldiers to the International military intervention against ISIL and missions to train local forces in Jordan and Ukraine. A considerable number of the regiment's soldiers participated in Operation Laser, the Canadian Armed Forces response to the COVID-19 pandemic in 2020.

=== War in Afghanistan ===
The regiment contributed an aggregate of more than 20% of its authorized strength to the various Task Forces which served in Afghanistan between 2002 and 2014. Two members of the regiment serving during Task Force 3-08, one in PSYOPS and the other in the battle group, were wounded and received the Sacrifice Medal.

== Alliances ==
- United Kingdom – The Royal Ulster Rifles (Formerly)
- United Kingdom – Lancashire Fusiliers (Till 1968)
- United Kingdom – The Royal Regiment of Fusiliers

== Battle honours ==
1991–2023 regimental colour

In the list below, battle honours in capitals were awarded for participation in large operations and campaigns, while those in lowercase indicate honours granted for more specific battles. Battle honours in bold type are emblazoned on the regimental colour. The stand of colours presented on October 14, 2023, by the lieutenant governor, Elizabeth Dowdeswell, are the first to incorporate battle honours from the War of 1812 and Afghanistan.

=== War of 1812 ===
- **DEFENCE OF CANADA, 1812–1815**
- **DETROIT**
- **QUEENSTON**
- **NIAGARA**

=== Great War ===
- **YPRES, 1915, '17**
- **FESTUBERT, 1915**
- **MOUNT SORREL**
- **SOMME, 1916**
- **ARRAS, 1917, '18**
- **HILL 70**
- **AMIENS**
- **HINDENBURG LINE**
- **PURSUIT TO MONS**

=== Second World War ===
- **SICILY, 1943**
- **ITALY, 1943–1945**
- **NORTH-WEST EUROPE, 1944–1945**

=== War in Afghanistan ===
- AFGHANISTAN

== Regimental Pipes and Drums ==
The Lorne Scots parades a military pipe band. The pipe band is known as the Regimental Pipes and Drums of the Lorne Scots (Peel, Dufferin and Halton Regiment). The band was formed in 1881 and has been active locally and internationally since that time. The Regimental Pipes and Drums of the Lorne Scots is one of the oldest pipe bands in Canada.

The pipe band provides musical support to the Lorne Scots and is one of many Canadian military bands. They are based out of the Col J.R. Barber Armoury in Georgetown, Ontario. The Regimental Pipes and Drums are part of Dufferin Company, the regiment's combat service support company and is made up of serving members of the regiment and volunteer musicians.

The Pipes and Drums of the Lorne Scots was the first Primary Reserve pipe band to play at the Edinburgh Military Tattoo, performing in 1960 and again in 1970. It has performed for Queen Elizabeth II, governors general, lieutenant governors, prime minister, and various premiers of Ontario. The band has toured the United Kingdom and the United States at various engagements, including playing at the Tower of London in the former nation. In 2015, the band took part in the Fortissimo Sunset Ceremony.

== Commanding officers ==
1. LCol Godfrey Fitzgerald, 1936–39
2. LCol Louis Keene, 1939
3. Col Reginald Conover, 1939–42
4. LCol Leonard Bertram, 1942–46
5. LCol Newton Powell,1946
6. LCol Charles Sharpe, 1946–47
7. LCol Herbert Chisholm, 1947–49
8. LCol John R. Barber, 1949–54
9. LCol Samuel Charters, 1954–57
10. LCol Arthur Kemp, 1957–61
11. LCol Edward Conover, 1961–65
12. LCol Robert Hardie, 1965–68
13. LCol Earl Lince, 1968–71
14. LCol Donald Egan, 1971–74
15. LCol Frank Ching, 1974–78
16. LCol Lowell Breckon, 1978–79
17. LCol Larry Smith, 1979–81
18. LCol Robin Hesler, 1981–85
19. LCol Jerry Derochie, 1985–88
20. LCol John Rodaway, 1988–92
21. LCol Richard Irvine, 1992–97
22. LCol Douglas Johnson, 1997–2000
23. LCol William Adcock, 2000–03
24. LCol Ross Welch, 2003–06
25. LCol Timothy Orange, 2006–09
26. LCol Andre. M. Phelps, 2009–2012
27. LCol Duane E Hickson, 2012–2016
28. LCol Tom Ruggle, 2016-2020
29. LCol Robert L Fraser, 2020–23
30. LCol Adam MacInnis, 2023–26
31. LCol Jason Kearney, 2026-Present

== Armouries ==
Site	Date(s)	Designated	Location	Description	Image
Col J.R. Barber Armoury; 91 Todd Road	1994	Canada's Register of Historic Places	Georgetown, Ontario	Centrally located structure with a low-pitched gable roof houses "Halton" Company	
Brampton Armoury; 2 Chapel Street	1914–15	1991 Recognized – Register of the Government of Canada Heritage Buildings	Brampton, Ontario	Housing "Peel" Company this centrally located, mid-size, rectangular building has a low-pitched gable roof	
Oakville Armoury		Canada's Register of Historic Places	Oakville, Ontario	Centrally located building with a low-pitched gable roof; home of Halton company 1 Plt	

== Lorne Scots Regimental Museum ==
Lorne Scots (Peel, Dufferin and Halton Regiment) Museum
- Location: 55 Queen St E, Brampton, ON L6W 2A8 Canada
- Type: Regimental Museum
- Website: http://www.lornesmuseum.ca

The Lorne Scots Regimental Museum preserves, for future generations, items of historical importance regarding this regiment and the Canadian Forces. The museum displays as many artifacts as possible which will perpetuate the memories and illustrate the histories of our forces and communities. The museum is affiliated with: CMA, CHIN, OMMC and Virtual Museum of Canada. The museum is located behind the armory in Brampton, Ontario. Exhibits include uniforms, weapons, musical instruments, maps, medals, documents, photographs and other regimental memorabilia. The museum is open on select days to both members of the regimental family and the general public. The museum also features a regimental kit shop.

== Order of precedence ==
Preceded by The Grey and Simcoe Foresters	The Lorne Scots (Peel, Dufferin and Halton Regiment)	Succeeded by The Brockville Rifles

== Media ==
- For Our Heritage: A History of the Lorne Scots (Peel, Dufferin and Halton Regiment) by Richard Ruggle (2008)
- The Badges and Uniforms of the Lorne Scots (Peel, Dufferin and Halton Regiment) Over 2 Centuries: 1800–2000 by Colonel E. F. Conover (2000)

== See also ==
- Canadian-Scottish regiment
- List of armouries in Canada
- The Canadian Crown and the Canadian Forces
- Military history of Canada
- History of the Canadian Army
- Canadian Forces
