= Lorne Rifles (Scottish) =

The Lorne Rifles (Scottish)
- Active: 1866–1936
- Country: Canada
- Branch: Canadian Militia
- Type: Rifles
- Role: Infantry
- Size: One regiment
- Part of: Non-Permanent Active Militia
- Garrison/HQ: Georgetown, Ontario
- March: Quick: "The Campbells Are Coming"
- Engagements: First World War
- Battle honours: See #Battle Honours

Insignia
- Tartan: Campbell of Argyll

The Lorne Rifles (Scottish) was an infantry regiment of the Non-Permanent Active Militia of the Canadian Militia (now the Canadian Army). First raised in the 1860s, the regiment was known for most of its existence as The Halton Rifles until 1931 when the regiment was renamed as The Lorne Rifles (Scottish). In 1936, the regiment was amalgamated with The Peel and Dufferin Regiment to form The Lorne Scots (Peel, Dufferin and Halton Regiment).

== Lineage ==
=== The Lorne Rifles (Scottish) ===
- Originated on 28 September 1866, in Milton, Ontario, as the 20th Halton Battalion of Infantry.
- Redesignated on 12 January 1872, as the 20th Halton Battalion of Rifles.
- Redesignated on 11 November 1881, as the 20th Halton Battalion, Lorne Rifles
- Redesignated on 8 May 1900, as the 20th Halton Regiment Lorne Rifles.
- Redesignated on 1 December 1909, as the 20th Regiment, Halton Rifles.
- Redesignated on 1 May 1920, as The Halton Rifles.
- Redesignated on 1 November 1931, as The Lorne Rifles (Scottish).
- Amalgamated on 15 December 1936, with The Peel and Dufferin Regiment and redesignated as The Lorne Scots (Peel, Dufferin and Halton Regiment).

== Perpetuations ==
- 37th Battalion (Northern Ontario), CEF
- 76th Battalion, CEF
- 164th Battalion (Halton and Dufferin), CEF

== History ==
=== Early history ===
With the passing of the Militia Act of 1855, the first of a number of newly-raised independent militia companies were established in and around the Halton County region of Canada West (now the Province of Ontario).

On 28 September 1866, the 20th Halton Battalion of Infantry was authorized for service by the regimentation of seven of these previously authorized independent militia rifle and infantry companies. Its regimental headquarters was at Milton, Ontario, and had companies at Oakville, Stewarttown, Georgetown, Norval, Nelson, Milton and Acton. On 11 November 1881, the battalion converted to the green-coated rifles organization instead of scarlet-clad line infantry, as the 20th Halton Battalion "Lorne Rifles". The name came from the courtesy title of the governor general, John Campbell, Marquess of Lorne.

=== The Great War ===
With the outbreak of the First World War, the 20th Halton Rifles as a unit was not mobilized but when the Canadian Expeditionary Force was raised in September 1914, drafts from various units were called up and formed into numbered battalions. The 20th Halton Rifles in particular contributed drafts to help form the 4th Battalion (Central Ontario), CEF as part of the First Canadian Contingent (later the 1st Canadian Division).

On 7 November 1914, the 37th Battalion (Northern Ontario), CEF was authorized for service and on 27 November 1915, the battalion embarked for Great Britain. After its arrival in the UK, the battalion provided reinforcements to the Canadian Corps in the field. On 9 July 1916, the battalion's personnel were absorbed by the 39th Battalion, CEF. On 21 May 1917, the 37th Battalion, CEF was disbanded.

On 10 July 1915, the 76th Battalion, CEF was authorized for service and on 23 April 1916, the battalion embarked for Great Britain. After its arrival in the UK, the battalion provided reinforcements to the Canadian Corps in the field. On 6 July 1916, the battalion's personnel were absorbed by the 36th Battalion, CEF. On 17 July 1917, the 76th Battalion, CEF was disbanded.

On 22 December 1915, the 164th Battalion (Halton and Dufferin), CEF was authorized for service and on 11 April 1917, the battalion embarked for Great Britain. After its arrival in the UK, the battalion provided reinforcements to the Canadian Corps in the field. On 16 April 1918, the battalion's personnel were absorbed by the 8th Reserve Battalion, CEF. On 29 November 1918, the 164th Battalion, CEF was disbanded.

=== 1920s–1930s ===
On 1 May 1920, as a result of the post-war militia reorganizations following the Otter Commission, the 20th Regiment, Halton Rifles was redesignated as The Halton Rifles and was reorganized with 3 battalions (2 of them paper-only reserve battalions) to perpetuate the assigned war-raised battalions of the Canadian Expeditionary Force.

On 1 November 1931, the Scottish connection to the regiment was again restored when The Halton Rifles were reorganized as The Lorne Rifles (Scottish) and received permission from Niall Campbell, 10th Duke of Argyll, the senior duke of Scotland, to use his personal crest, the boar's head and tartan trews of his personal tartan, the Ordinary Campbell.

On 15 December 1936, as a result of the 1936 Canadian Militia reorganization, The Lorne Rifles (Scottish) were amalgamated with The Peel and Dufferin Regiment to form The Lorne Scots (Peel, Dufferin and Halton Regiment).

== Organization ==
=== 20th Halton Battalion of Infantry (28 September, 1866) ===
- Regimental Headquarters (Milton)
- No. 1 Company (Oakville) (first raised on 13 December 1861 as the Oakville Rifle Company)
- No. 2 Company (Stewarttown) (first raised on 9 January 1863 as the Stewarttown Infantry Company; moved on 1 May 1906 to Norval)
- No. 3 Company (Georgetown) (first raised on 30 January 1863 as the Georgetown Infantry Company)
- No. 4 Company (Norval) (first raised on 6 February 1863 as the Norval Infantry Company; moved on 18 September 1885 to Campbellville)
- No. 5 Company (Nelson) (first raised on 15 June 1866; moved on 1 March 1887 to Burlington)
- No. 6 Company (Milton) (first raised on 15 June 1866; disbanded in 1869)
- No. 7 Company (Acton) (first raised on 6 July 1866; redesignated on 25 November 1870 as No. 6 Company)
- No. 8 Company (Nassagewaya) (first raised on 4 December 1866; redesignated on 25 November 1870 as No. 7 Company; moved on 1 September 1871 to Nelson)

=== 20th Regiment, Halton Rifles (1 December, 1909) ===
- A Company (Oakville)
- B Company (Norval)
- C Company (Georgetown)
- D Company (Campbellville)
- E Company (Burlington)
- F Company (Acton)
- G Company (Milton)
- H Company (Hornby; moved on 1 April 1914, to Esquesing)

=== The Halton Rifles (1 December, 1920) ===
- Regimental Headquarters (Georgetown)
- 1st Battalion (perpetuating the 37th Battalion, CEF)
  - A Company (Oakville)
  - B Company (Milton)
  - C Company (Burlington)
  - D Company (Georgetown)
- 2nd (Reserve) Battalion (perpetuating the 76th Battalion, CEF)
- 3rd (Reserve) Battalion (perpetuating the 164th Battalion, CEF)

== Alliances ==
United Kingdom – The Royal Ulster Rifles (1920s–1936)

== Battle honours ==
- Mount Sorrel
- Somme, 1916
- Arras, 1917, ‘18
- Hill 70
- Ypres, 1917
- Amiens
- Hindenburg Line
- Pursuit to Mons

== Notable members ==
- Captain Frank C. Ford

== See also ==
- Canadian-Scottish regiment
