= James Ballantine (military officer) =

Canadian ice hockey coach

Lieutenant-colonel James Ballantine DSO CMG
- Born: September 3, 1876; Georgetown, Ontario, Canada
- Died: January 7, 1948 (aged 71); Georgetown, Ontario, Canada
- Military career
- Allegiance: Canada
- Branch: Canadian Army
- Service years: 1898–1917
- Rank: Lieutenant-colonel
- Commands: 4th Battalion CEF (1915); 76th Battalion CEF (1916); 109th Battalion CEF (1917)
- Conflicts: Second Boer War; World War I; Second Battle of Ypres
- Awards: Queen's South Africa Medal; Distinguished Service Order Coaching career

Biographical details
- Education: Royal Military College

Coaching career (HC unless noted)

lacrosse
- 1917–1933: Colgate

rifle
- 1917–1928: Colgate

soccer
- 1917–1924: Colgate

ice hockey
- 1920–1922 1927–1928: Colgate

Head coaching record
- Overall: 17–62–5 (.232) [lacrosse] 14–10–7 (.565) [soccer] 2–11–0 (.154) [hockey]

Lieutenant-Colonel James Ballantine DSO, CMG was a Canadian veteran of both the Second Boer War and World War I. He later served as a coach and administrator at Colgate University.

== Career ==
=== Military ===
Born in Georgetown, Ballantine enrolled at the Royal Military College in 1894 and was a member of the 20th Halton Battalion. He received training at Aldershot and graduated in time to join the British Army for the Second Boer War. At the war's end he received the Queen's Medal for gallantry. Ballantine remained in the military after the war and served in posts within Canada until the outbreak of World War I. Then-Major Ballantine initially served as second in command of the 4th Battalion but assumed temporary control after Arthur Birchall was killed at the Second Battle of Ypres.

Ballantine was severely wounded and returned to Canada to convalesce in the summer of 1915. While recuperating, he was award the Distinguished Service Order by King George V and promoted to Lieutenant-colonel. Once he had recovered, Ballantine organized the 76th Battalion and commanded the unit when it was deployed to France in April 1916. Ballantine remained as its commander until the unit was absorbed by the 36th Battalion. Afterwards, Ballantine was made a Companion of the Order of St Michael and St George for his efforts and briefly commanded the 109th Battalion before it too was absorbed into another unit. Ballantine returned to France with the 4th Battalion and commanded troops on the RMS Empress of Britain until he was mustered out in April 1917.

=== College ===
In August 1917, Ballantine accepted the directorship of military science at Colgate University in New York. Shortly after his appointment, he was also named as superintendent of ground and buildings as well as taking over the head coaching duties for the school's lacrosse, rifle and soccer teams. Ballantine relinquished control of the soccer team in 1924, helmed the rifle team until its dissolution in 1928 and remained the coach of the lacrosse team until his retirement in 1933. Ballantine also intermittently coached the ice hockey team for three seasons.

After his tenure with Colgate ended, Ballantine returned to Georgetown where he remained until his death in 1948.

== Head coaching record ==
=== Lacrosse ===
Record table
Season	Team	Overall	Conference	Standing	Postseason
Colgate Independent (1921–1933)
1921	Colgate	1–3–1			
1922	Colgate	0–5–0			
1923	Colgate	0–5–0			
1924	Colgate	2–3–0			
1925	Colgate	1–7–0			
1926	Colgate	2–5–0			
1927	Colgate	2–2–3			
1928	Colgate	5–4–0			
1929	Colgate	0–7–0			
1930	Colgate	2–3–1			
1931	Colgate	1–6–0			
1932	Colgate	1–5–0			
1933	Colgate	0–7–0			
Total:		17–62–5			
National champion Postseason invitational champion Conference regular season champion Conference regular season and conference tournament champion Division regular season champion Division regular season and conference tournament champion Conference tournament champion

=== Soccer ===
Record table
Season	Team	Overall	Conference	Standing	Postseason
Colgate Independent (1920–1924)
1920	Colgate	2–1–0			
1921	Colgate	2–4–3			
1922	Colgate	1–2–2			
1923	Colgate	5–0–1			
1924	Colgate	4–3–1			
Total:		14–10–7			
National champion Postseason invitational champion Conference regular season champion Conference regular season and conference tournament champion Division regular season champion Division regular season and conference tournament champion Conference tournament champion

=== Ice hockey ===
Record table
Season	Team	Overall	Conference	Standing	Postseason
Colgate Independent (1920–1922)
1920–21	Colgate	2–3–0			
1921–22	Colgate	0–4–0			
Colgate Independent (1927–1928)
1927–28	Colgate	0–4–0			
Total:		2–11–0			
National champion Postseason invitational champion Conference regular season champion Conference regular season and conference tournament champion Division regular season champion Division regular season and conference tournament champion Conference tournament champion

== Decorations and medals ==
Ballantine's medal ribbon board

Distinguished Service Order (1916)	Order of St Michael and St George (1917)	1914–15 Star (1918)
British War Medal (1919)	Victory Medal (Mentioned in Dispatches) (1919)	Queen's South Africa Medal (1902)
