= 2nd Regiment of York Militia =

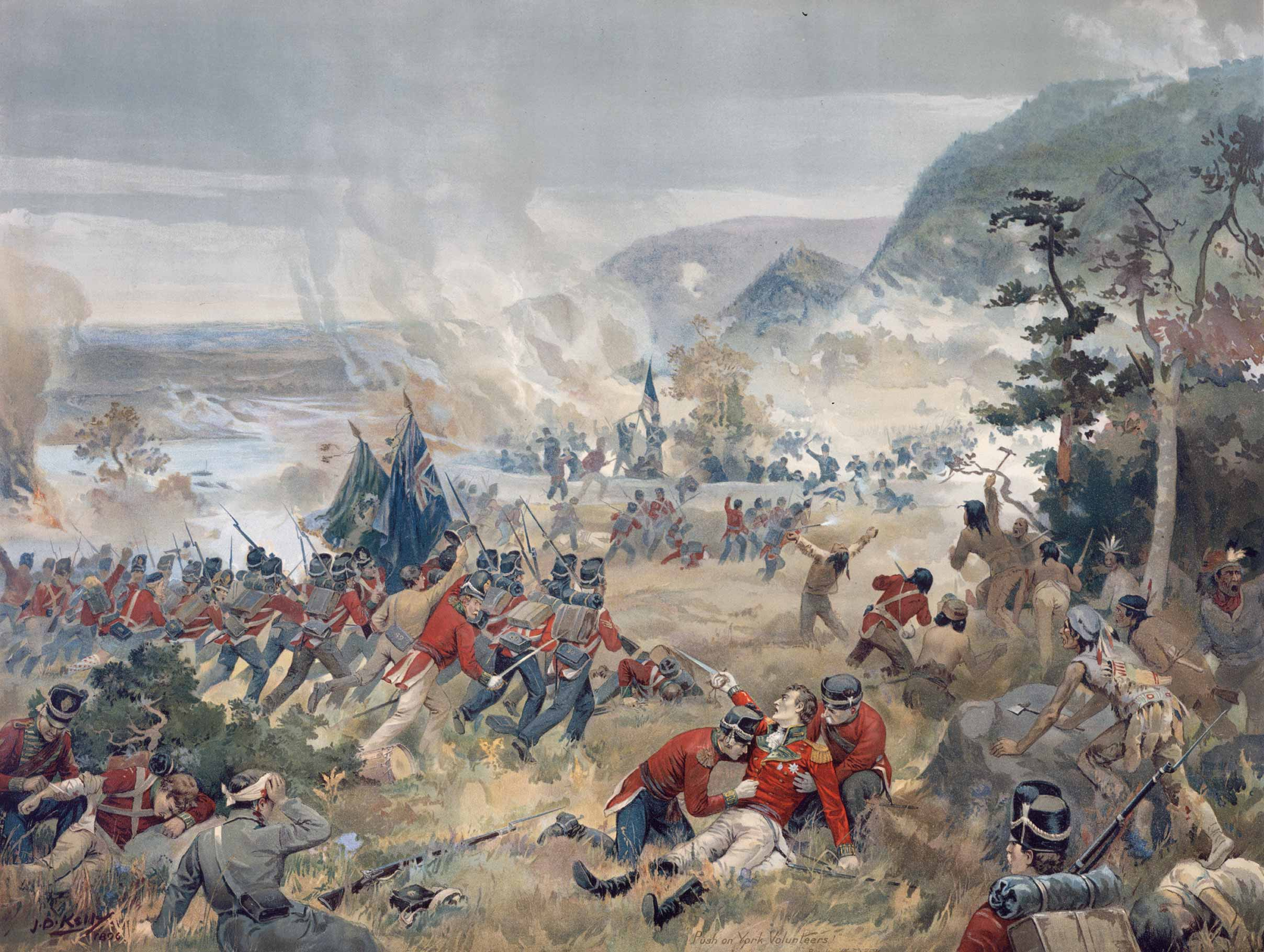
- The regiment (left foreground) at the Battle of Queenston Heights
- Active: 1812–1852
- Country: Upper Canada
- Allegiance: British Empire
- Branch: Canadian Militia
- Type: Infantry
- Role: Line infantry
- Part of: York Militia
- Engagements: War of 1812: Siege of Detroit; Battle of Queenston Heights

The 2nd Regiment of York Militia was a Canadian Militia regiment active during the War of 1812. They were part of the York Militia, which at that time was three Regiments strong. The 2nd Regiment was recruited around the present-day Halton and Peel Regions.

The Militia were recruited from men living in the townships of Toronto, Trafalgar, Flamborough East and Flamborough West, Nelson, Ancaster, Barton, Beverly, and Saltfleet, which mainly composed the western Wentworth. All men between 16 and 50 years were enrolled to the military and called out annually "to be reviewed and exercised.

== War of 1812 ==
At the beginning of the War, two Flank Companies were mobilized to fight alongside the 41st Regiment of Foot. One of these was commanded by Captain John Chisholm. They were present at the battle of Queenston Heights, where they heard the (alleged) last words of Major General Isaac Brock, "Push on the brave York volunteers."

== After the War of 1812 ==
The 2nd Regiment remained in the York Militia until sub-units of it were broken off to form the Halton Militia in 1816 and the Peel Militia in 1852. These units, along with volunteer companies formed in the two counties between 1857 and 1865, were formed into the 20th Halton Battalion of Infantry and the 36th Peel Battalion in 1866. These two Regiments would later form The Lorne Scots. On formation of the Lorne Scots in 1936, the 2nd Regiment finally came back together, 120 years after it first split. The Lorne Scots now carry four battle honours from the 2nd Regiment during the War of 1812.

The 2nd Regiment of York Militia is perpetuated in the Canadian Army by the Royal Hamilton Light Infantry.

There is a reenactment group representing the 2nd York Regiment of Militia which operates out of Mississauga, Ontario.
