= E. Grahame Joy =

Canadian flying ace

Ernst Grahame Joy
- Born: 2 November 1888; Anniston, Alabama, USA
- Died: 21 June 1993 (aged 104); Toronto, Ontario, Canada
- Military career
- Allegiance: Canada
- Branch: Canadian Expeditionary Force; British Army; Royal Air Force; Royal Canadian Air Force
- Rank: Major
- Units: 74th Battalion, CEF; 60th Battalion, CEF; Central Ontario Regiment, CEF; No. 49 Squadron RFC; No. 57 Squadron RFC; No. 205 Squadron RAF
- Conflicts: World War I; Western Front; World War II
- Awards: Distinguished Flying Cross
- Other work: Lawyer

Major Ernst Grahame Joy DFC (2 November 1888 – 21 June 1993) was an American-born Canadian who became a flying ace during the First World War, credited with eight aerial victories. He had set aside his law studies and family obligations to join the Canadian Expeditionary Force, then transferred to the Royal Flying Corps. While he left military service after World War I to practice law, he would return to the colours for World War II.

== Early life ==
Ernst Grahame Joy was born in Anniston, Alabama, USA on 2 November 1888. He was the son of Jean Hannah Grahame and Harold Holt Joy.

He was a third year law student in Osgoode Hall Law School's Class of 1916 in Toronto when he enlisted into the 74th Battalion of the Canadian Expeditionary Force on 1 July 1915. On his enlistment forms, he claimed to be married. Because of five years previous experience in the Canadian military, he was accepted at the rank of major. His oath of allegiance to King George V denoted him as a naturalized Canadian citizen, as an American could not swear such an oath without losing his citizenship. However, genealogical records give his marriage date as 15 July 1915. He married Dorothy Ewart Primrose of Toronto in Humphries Township. His military unit at time of marriage was recorded as 60th Battalion, CEF. Joy's physical examination at enlistment showed him to be 6 ft 1/2 in (1.84 m) tall, with swarthy complexion and brown hair and eyes.

== World War I ==
Joy was seconded to the Royal Flying Corps from the Central Ontario Regiment, CEF, and appointed a flying officer on 23 April 1917. On 9 May 1917, he was posted to No. 49 Squadron, but soon moved on to No. 23 Squadron. In June or July 1917, he was assigned to No. 57 Squadron as a bomber pilot. He scored seven victories for them in July and August 1917, before going to No. 205 Squadron. On 1 September 1917, he was appointed a flight commander. He scored once more, on 4 November 1918, a week before the armistice.

== List of aerial victories ==
Combat record
No.	Date/Time	Aircraft/ Serial No.	Opponent	Result	Location	Notes
No. 57 Squadron RFC
1	28 July 1917 @ 1830 hours	Airco DH.4 (A7537)	Albatros D.V	Driven down out of control	Ingelmunster	Observer/gunner: Forde Leathley
2	28 July 1917 @ 1830 hours	Airco DH.4 (A7537)	Albatros D.V	Driven down out of control	Ingelmunster	Observer/gunner: Forde Leathley
3	16 August 1917 @ 1745 hours	Airco DH.4 (A7563)	Albatros D.V	Driven down out of control	Houthulst	Observer/gunner: Forde Leathley
4	17 August 1917 @ 0730–0732 hours	Airco DH.4 (A7563)	Albatros D.V	Driven down out of control	Menen	Observer/gunner: Forde Leathley
5	17 August 1917 @ 0730–0732 hours	Airco DH.4 (A7563)	Albatros D.V	Driven down out of control	Menen	Observer/gunner: Forde Leathley
6	17 August 1917 @ 0730–0732 hours	Airco DH.4 (A7563)	Albatros D.V	Driven down out of control	Menen	Observer/gunner: Forde Leathley
7	20 August 1917 @ 1115 hours	Airco DH.4 (A7564)	Albatros D.V	Driven down out of control	East of Ypres	Observer/gunner: Forde Leathley
No. 205 Squadron RAF
8	4 November 1918 @ 1535 hours	Airco DH.9a (F1025)	Fokker D.VII	Destroyed	Maubeuge	Observer/gunner: L. A. Drain

== Post World War I ==
On 31 May 1919, Joy's secondment to the RAF ended, and he also relinquished his commission. He was awarded the Distinguished Flying Cross in 1919, though no details of the award are available. There also is no record of his discharge date from the military; however, he returned to Canada and practiced law.

Joy served with the Royal Canadian Air Force during World War II.

He died in Toronto, Ontario on 21 June 1993.
