= James Munroe Franklin =

Black Canadian WWI Soldier

- Born: October 12, 1899; Mississippi, U.S.
- Died: October 6, 1916 (aged 16); France
- Military career
- Allegiance: Canada
- Branch: Canadian Expeditionary Force
- Service years: 1915–1916
- Rank: Private
- Unit: 4th Overseas Battalion
- Conflicts: Battle of the Somme; Attack on Regina Trench

James Munroe Franklin (October 12, 1899 – October 6, 1916) was a private in the Canadian Expeditionary Force (CEF) and is believed to be the first Black Canadian to be killed in action during the First World War. Born in Mississippi, Franklin and his family immigrated to Hamilton, Ontario in 1901. In July 1915, he was one of the first Black Canadians to be accepted into the CEF, and was deployed in France as part of the 4th Overseas Battalion. In October 1916, he participated in the assault in the Attack on Regina Trench in the Battle of the Somme. James M. Franklin was one of the 770 Canadian casualties.

== Historical Context ==
Due to the anti-Black racism prevalent in the recruiting services, Black Canadian volunteers were rarely enlisted, but they continued to try because enlisting was seen as a way to prove loyalty to the state and Crown in a country where Black citizens were seen as outsiders. In trying to curtail Black men from enlisting in the “white man’s war,” various officials used personal discretion to reject applicants.The protestations of White soldiers prompted CEF to offer a segregation option; which Black soldiers were encouraged to accept. Franklin was one of the few enlisted Black men not to be segregated into the No. 2 Construction Battalion or the No. 8 Company during WWI.
