= 126th Battalion (Peel), CEF =

The 126th Battalion (Peel), CEF was a unit in the Canadian Expeditionary Force during the First World War. Based in Toronto, Ontario, the unit began recruiting in late 1915 in Peel County. After sailing to England in August 1916, the battalion was absorbed into the 109th and 116th Battalions, CEF, and the 8th Reserve Battalion on October 13, 1916. The 126th Battalion (Peel), CEF, had one Officer Commanding: Lieut-Col. F. J. Hamilton.

The 126 Battalion (Peel), CEF is perpetuated by The Lorne Scots (Peel, Dufferin and Halton Regiment).
