= Victoria and Haliburton Regiment =

The Victoria and Haliburton Regiment
- Active: 1866–1936
- Country: Canada
- Branch: Canadian Militia
- Type: Line infantry
- Part of: Non-Permanent Active Militia
- Garrison/HQ: Lindsay, Ontario
- Motto(s): Where duty leads
- Engagements: Fenian Raids; North-West Rebellion; Second Boer War; First World War
- Battle honours: See #Battle honours

The Victoria and Haliburton Regiment was an infantry regiment of the Non-Permanent Active Militia of the Canadian Militia (now the Canadian Army). In 1936, the regiment was converted from infantry to artillery to become the 45th Field Battery RCA and now forms part of the 50th Field Artillery Regiment (The Prince of Wales Rangers), RCA (currently on the Supplementary Order of Battle).

== Lineage ==
=== The Victoria and Haliburton Regiment ===
- Originated on 16 November 1866, in Bowmanville, Canada West, as the 45th West Durham Battalion of Infantry.
- Redesignated on 1 January 1898, as the 45th Victoria Battalion of Infantry.
- Redesignated on 8 May 1900, as the 45th Victoria Regiment.
- Redesignated on 16 July 1917, as the 45th Victoria and Haliburton Regiment.
- Redesignated on 12 March 1920, as The Victoria and Haliburton Regiment.
- Amalgamated on 14 December 1936, with the 45th Field Battery, RCA and redesignated as the 45th Field Battery (Howitzer), RCA.

== Perpetuations ==
- 109th Battalion (Victoria & Haliburton), CEF
- 252nd Battalion (Lindsay), CEF

== History ==
=== Early history ===
With the passing of the Militia Act of 1855, the first of a number of newly-raised independent militia companies were established in and around the Durham County region of Canada West (now the Province of Ontario). These companies would see active service when called out during the Fenian Raids of the late 1860s.

On 16 November 1866, the 45th West Durham Battalion of Infantry was authorized for service by the regimentation of four of these previously authorized independent militia rifle and infantry companies. Its regimental headquarters was at Bowmanville and had companies at Bowmanville, Orono, Cartwright and Newcastle.

=== North West Rebellion and late 19th century ===
On 10 April 1885, the 45th West Durham Battalion of Infantry mobilized a company for active service with The Midland Battalion where it served in the Alberta Column of the North West Field Force. On 24 July 1885, the company was removed from active service.

On 1 January 1898, the 45th West Durham Battalion of Infantry was redesignated as the 45th Victoria Battalion of Infantry.

=== South African War and early 1900s ===
During the South African War, the 45th Victoria Battalion of Infantry contributed volunteers for the Canadian contingents serving overseas; serving with the 2nd (Special Service) Battalion, The Royal Canadian Regiment, Strathcona’s Horse, the Canadian Mounted Rifles and the Royal Canadian Artillery.

On 8 May 1900, the 45th Victoria Battalion of Infantry was redesignated as the 45th Victoria Regiment.

=== Great War ===
On 22 December 1915, the 109th Battalion (Victoria & Haliburton), CEF was authorized and on 23 July 1916, the battalion embarked for Great Britain. After its arrival in the UK, the battalion provided reinforcements to the Canadian Corps in the field until 5 October to 8 December 1916, when its personnel were absorbed by the 20th Battalion (Central Ontario), CEF; the 21st Battalion (Eastern Ontario), CEF; the 38th Battalion (Ottawa), CEF; and the 124th Battalion (Governor General's Body Guard), CEF. On 21 May 1917, the 109th Battalion, CEF was disbanded.

On 1 May 1917, the 252nd Battalion (Lindsay), CEF was authorized for service and on 2 June 1917, the battalion embarked for Great Britain. After its arrival in the UK, the battalion was absorbed by the 6th Reserve Battalion, CEF to provide reinforcements for the Canadian Corps in the field. On 1 September 1917, the 252nd Battalion, CEF was disbanded.

=== 1920s–1930s ===
On 15 March 1920, as a result of the reorganization of the Canadian Militia following the Otter Commission, the 45th Victoria and Haliburton Regiment was redesignated as The Victoria and Haliburton Regiment and was reorganized with two battalions (one of them a paper-only reserve battalion) to perpetuate the assigned war-raised battalions of the Canadian Expeditionary Force.

On 15 December 1936, as a result of the 1936 militia reorganization, The Victoria and Haliburton Regiment was converted from infantry to artillery and amalgamated with the 45th Medium Battery, RCA, and redesignated as the 45th Field Battery (Howitzer), RCA.

== Organization ==
=== 45th West Durham Battalion of Infantry (16 November 1866) ===
- Regimental Headquarters (Bowmanville)
- No. 1 Company (Bowmanville) (first raised on 22 January 1862 as the Bowmanville Rifle Company)
- No. 2 Company (Orono) (first raised on 22 June 1866 as the Orono Infantry Company)
- No. 3 Company (Cartwright) (first raised on 17 August 1866 as the Cartwright Infantry Company)
- No. 4 Company (Newcastle) (first raised on 17 August 1866 as the Newcastle Infantry Company)

=== 45th Victoria Regiment (8 May 1900) ===
- Regimental Headquarters (Lindsay)
- No. 1 Company (Cameron)
- No. 2 Company (Lindsay)
- No. 3 Company (Lindsay)
- No. 4 Company (Omemee)
- No. 5 Company (Janetville; later moved in 1905 to Fenelon Falls)
- No. 6 Company (Woodville)

=== The Victoria and Haliburton Regiment (15 September 1920) ===
- 1st Battalion (perpetuating the 109th Battalion, CEF)
- 2nd (Reserve) Battalion (perpetuating the 252nd Battalion, CEF)

== Battle honours ==
- Arras, 1917 (Note: Selected to be borne on colours and appointments)
- Hill 70
- Ypres, 1917

== Notable members ==
- The Honourable Sir Sam Hughes, KCB PC
- Lieutenant Colonel James Macleod
