= Christopher O'Kelly =

Canadian World War I officer and prospector

Christopher Patrick John O'Kelly VC MC
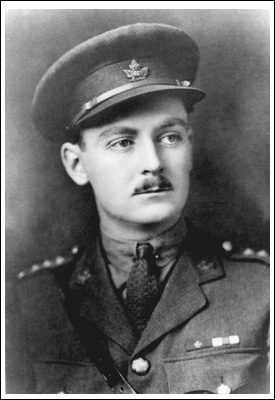
- Born: 18 November 1895; Winnipeg, Manitoba, Canada
- Died: 15 November 1922 (aged 26); Lac Seul, Ontario, Canada
- Military career
- Allegiance: Canada
- Branch: Canadian Expeditionary Force
- Service years: 1915 - 1922
- Rank: Major
- Unit: 52nd Battalion (New Ontario), CEF
- Conflicts: World War I
- Awards: Victoria Cross; Military Cross

Christopher Patrick John O'Kelly VC MC (18 November 1895 – 15 November 1922) was a Canadian First World War officer and prospector. O'Kelly was a recipient of the Victoria Cross, the highest and most prestigious award for gallantry in the face of the enemy that can be awarded to British and Commonwealth forces.

== Biography ==
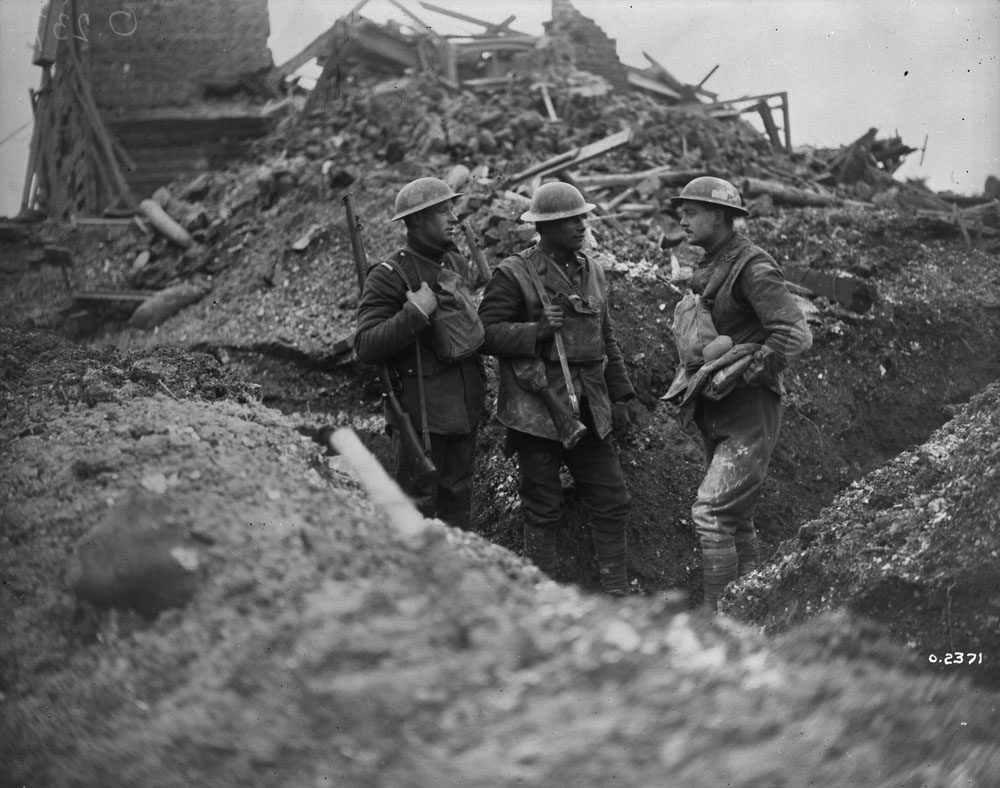
Captain O'Kelly (right) on 12 January 1918

Born in Winnipeg, Manitoba, O'Kelly joined the Canadian Expeditionary Force in October 1915 during the First World War. He was 21 years old and an acting captain in the 52nd Battalion (New Ontario), CEF, when on 26 October 1917, in the Battle of Passchendaele, Belgium, he led his company in the action that resulted in his Victoria Cross. His citation reads:

Lt. (A./Capt.) Christopher Patrick John O'Kelly, M.C., Can. Inf.

For most conspicuous bravery in an action in which he led his company with extraordinary skill and determination. After the original attack had failed and two companies of his unit had launched a new attack, Capt. O'Kelly advanced his command over 1,000 yards under heavy fire without any artillery barrage, took the enemy positions on the crest of the hill by storm, and then personally organised and led a series of attacks against " Pill-boxes," his company alone capturing six of them with 100 prisoners and 10 machine guns. Later on in the afternoon, under the leadership of this gallant officer, his company repelled a strong counter-attack, taking more prisoners, and subsequently during the night captured a hostile raiding party consisting of one officer, 10 men and a machine gun.

The whole of these achievements were chiefly due to the magnificent courage, daring and ability of Capt. O'Kelly.

He was later promoted the rank of major.

After the war, O'Kelly became a prospector in northwestern Ontario.

He drowned in 1922 while canoeing on Lac Seul. His Victoria Cross is displayed at the Canadian War Museum in Ottawa, Canada.
