= No. 57 Squadron RAF =

Flying squadron of the Royal Air Force

- Squadron badge
- Active: 1916–1918 (RFC); 1918–1919; 1931–1945; 1945–1957; 1959–1986; 1992–2002; 2008 – present
- Country: United Kingdom
- Branch: Royal Air Force
- Type: Flying squadron
- Role: Elementary flying training
- Part of: No. 3 Flying Training School
- Station: RAF Cranwell
- Mottos: Corpus non animum muto (Latin for 'I change my body not my spirit')
- Aircraft: Grob Prefect T1

Insignia
- Tail codes: EQ (Nov 1938 – Sep 1939); DX (Apr 1940 – Apr 1951); QT (1944 – Nov 1945, 'C' Flt)

Number 57 Squadron, also known as No. LVII Squadron, is a Royal Air Force flying training squadron, operating the Grob Prefect T1 from RAF Cranwell, Lincolnshire.

It was formed in 1916 during World War I as part of the RFC, moving to France as a fighter-reconnaissance unit, and changing to a bomber-reconnaissance unit in 1917. Disbanded in 1919, it reformed in 1931 with light biplane bombers, before receiving the more modern Bristol Blenheim bomber in time for World War II. No. 57 squadron served in France in support of the British Expeditionary Force until the fall of France and withdrawal back to England. They re-equipped with Wellingtons, and later with Lancaster heavy bombers, flying over five thousand sorties from 1939 – 1945.

Post-war, No. 57 continued as a bomber squadron for many years through changes of personnel, home base, and aircraft type, including over 27 years as an element of Britain's V-bomber force. After another disbandment in 1986, and reformation in 1992, the squadron flew the C-130 Hercules for ten years. Its current reincarnation commenced in 2008 as a training unit flying the Grob Tutor at RAF Cranwell.

== History ==
=== First World War ===
No. 57 Squadron of the Royal Flying Corps was formed on 8 June 1916 at Copmanthorpe, Yorkshire when it was split off from No. 33 Squadron, taking on its parent unit's part-time training role to allow No. 33 Squadron to concentrate on its primary duties as a night fighter unit. No. 57 Squadron continued in its training role, equipped with a mixture of Avro 504s and Royal Aircraft Factory B.E.2s, until October that year, when it began to prepare for its planned role as a fighter-reconnaissance squadron, receiving Royal Aircraft Factory F.E.2d two-seat pusher biplanes in November.

On 16 December 1916, the squadron arrived at St. André-aux-Bois in France, moving to Fienvillers on 22 January 1917. By April 1917, the F.E.2d was obsolete, and the squadron suffered heavy losses supporting the British offensive at Arras. Examples included the loss of five F.E.2s in combat with a formation of German two-seaters on 6 April and the shooting down of three F.E.2s from a formation of seven by a group of 20 German fighters. The squadron re-equipped with more modern Airco DH.4s in May 1917, changing its role to long-range bomber-reconnaissance. After training on the new type, the squadron commenced operations near Ypres in June of that year, moving to Droglandt on 12 June and Boisdinghem on 27 June. The squadron joined the 27th Wing, part of the V Brigade Royal Flying Corps, to support the British Army at the Ypres Offensive. The squadron's activities included bombing railway junctions and German airfields during the Battle of Langemarck in August 1917 and reconnaissance duties during the Battle of the Menin Road Ridge in September.

The squadron was deployed against the German spring offensive of 1918, attacking railway targets, taking part in both low- and high-level attacks to try to stem the German advance. From August 1918, the squadron carried out operations in support of the series of Allied offensives against the Germans that became known as the Hundred Days Offensive.

It was one of the few bomber units to produce flying aces, having five on strength. William Edward Green scored nine wins, and Forde Leathley eight, E. Grahame Joy seven with the squadron, (Note: He gained another victory later with 205 squadron) and Arthur Thomas Drinkwater scored six, all in Airco DH.4s. In total, the squadron claimed 166 German aircraft during the war, dropping 285 tons of bombs and taking 22,030 photos.

Following the Armistice in November 1918 the squadron was assigned to mail carrying duties before returning to the UK in August 1919. It was based at RAF South Carlton from 4 August 1919 as a cadre before being disbanded on 31 December 1919.

=== Between the Wars ===
The squadron re-formed at RAF Netheravon on 20 October 1931 equipped with the Hawker Hart single-engined light bomber. It moved to RAF Upper Heyford on 5 September 1932. In 1933, No. 57 Squadron took part in the annual RAF Air Display at RAF Hendon, and together with No. 18 Squadron and No. 33 Squadron, demonstrated a formation takeoff by a three-squadron light bomber wing, repeating this display (this time in conjunction with No. XV Squadron and No. 18 Squadron) at the 1935 show. Another highlight was participation in the Royal Review of the RAF by King George V at RAF Mildenhall and RAF Duxford on 6 July 1935. The squadron started to receive the Hawker Hind, an improved development of the Hart, in March 1936, replacing the Hart by May 1936. On 1 May 1936, the squadron joined the newly established No. 1 Group, which became part of RAF Bomber Command on 14 July 1936. The squadron re-equipped with Bristol Blenheim Mk I twin-engined monoplane bombers from March 1938, discarding its last Hinds in May that year. The squadron joined No. 2 Group on 1 January 1939, training for both anti-shipping missions and low-level close support operations.

=== Second World War ===
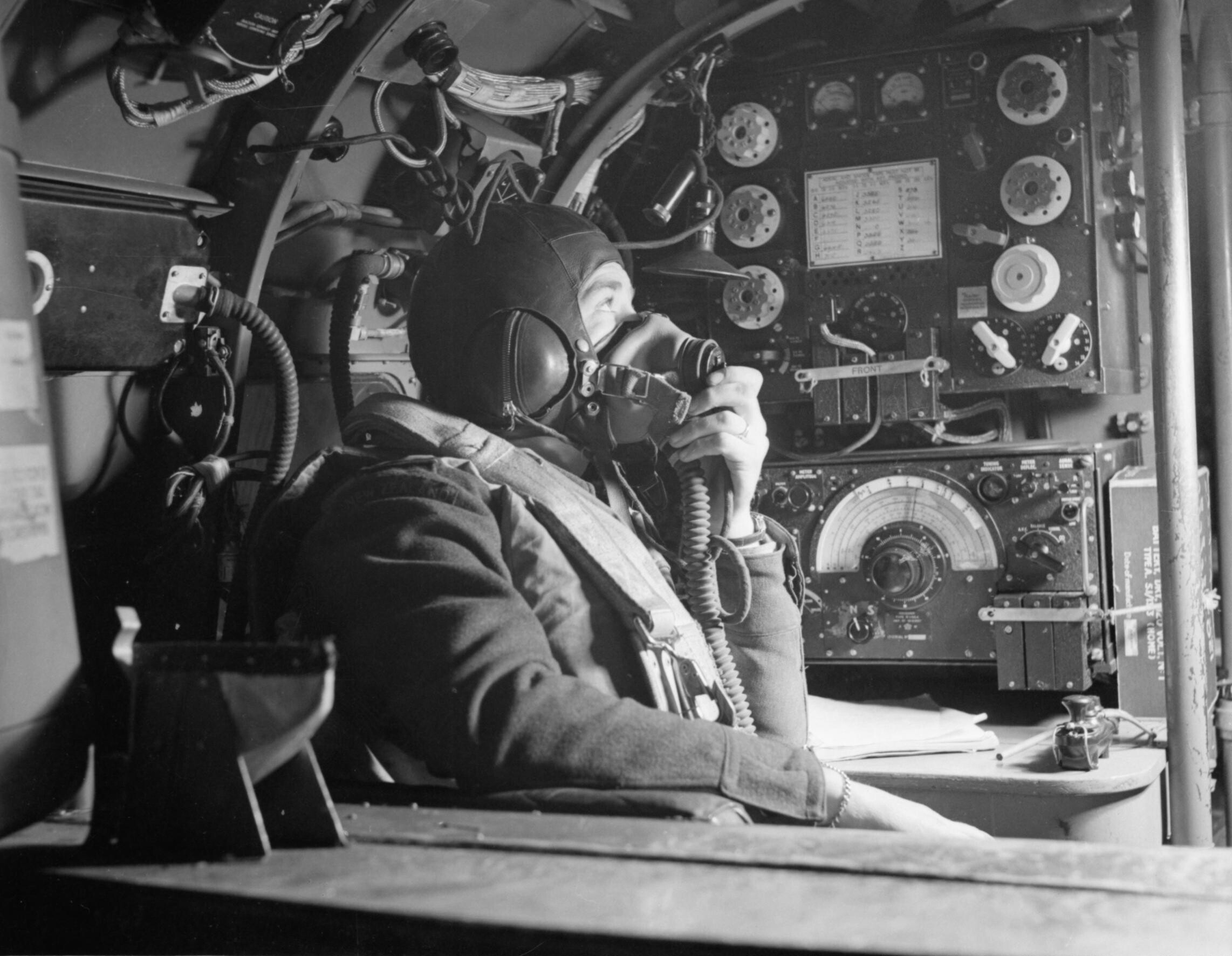
Flying Officer R.W. Stewart, a wireless operator on a Lancaster of No. 57 Squadron based at RAF Scampton speaking to the pilot from his position in front of the Marconi T1154/R1155 transmitter/receiver set

Following the outbreak of the Second World War 57 Squadron moved to France as part of the Air Component of the British Expeditionary Force, operating from Roye/Amy from 24 September 1939 in the strategic reconnaissance role and moving to Rosières-en-Santerre on 18 October. Following the German invasion of May 1940, the squadron re-added bombing to its reconnaissance duties, but was forced to frequently change bases to avoid the German advance, moving to Poix on 17 May and Crécy-en-Ponthieu (the site of the Battle of Crécy in 1346) before evacuating to England on 21 May. After a brief stay at Wyton the squadron was tasked with carrying out anti-shipping strikes against the coast of Norway and moved to RAF Elgin in Scotland.

The squadron moved to Feltwell in November 1940 to re-equip with the Vickers Wellington medium bomber. In September 1942 the squadron moved to Scampton and converted to Avro Lancaster heavy bombers. This was followed by a move to East Kirkby in August 1943 from where it operated for the remainder of the war, until disbanding on 25 November 1945.

During the War 57 Squadron flew 5151 operational sorties and lost 172 aircraft.

=== Early Cold War (1945–1957) ===
57 Squadron was re-formed on 26 November 1945 at RAF Elsham Wolds by the re-numbering of 103 Squadron; it operated the Lancaster I and II and the Avro Lincoln. On 2 December 1945 the squadron moved to RAF Scampton before moving to RAF Lindholme with the Lincolns, then moved again in October 1946 to RAF Waddington. In May 1951, the squadron moved to RAF Marham, Norfolk, where it converted to the Boeing Washington B.1. (Note: Washington's were American Boeing Superfortresses on loan to the UK from 1950 to 1954. These covered the period until the RAF brought the English Electric Canberra jet bomber into service.) After converting it moved in June 1951 to RAF Waddington and in April 1952 to RAF Coningsby.

The Washingtons were retired in 1953 and the squadron re-equipped with the twin jet English Electric Canberra B.2 from May 1953. The following year the squadron moved to RAF Cottesmore, in February 1955 it moved to RAF Honington, Suffolk, and in November 1956 returned to RAF Coningsby. The squadron disbanded at Coningsby on 9 December 1957.

=== Handley Page Victor (1959–1986) ===
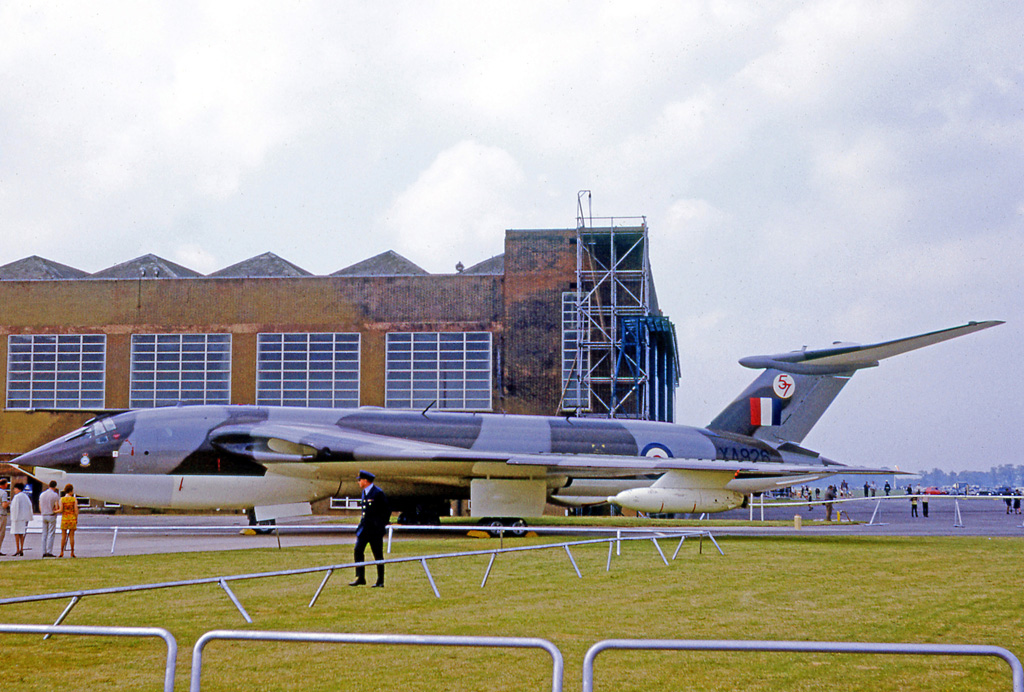
Handley Page Victor K.1A tanker XA926 of No. 57 Squadron in 1968.

The squadron re-formed on 1 January 1959 at RAF Honington as part of the V bomber strategic nuclear force equipped with the Handley Page Victor B.1. In 1963 8 Victors were sent from Honington and Gaydon to support FEAF during the Indonesian Confrontation. Aircrew, Groundcrew and aircraft from 55 and 57 Squadrons rotated as required until August 1965 when 57 Sqn returned to Honington. In December 1965, the squadron moved to RAF Marham to take on the role of a tanker squadron with the Victor K.1 after the Vickers Valiant tanker fleet was withdrawn due to wing spar issues.

In June 1976, the squadron began to convert over to the Victor K.2. On 25 June 1979, No. LVII Squadron helped support McDonnell Douglas Phantom FGR.2 XV424 across the Atlantic on its flight to mark the 60th anniversary of the Transatlantic flight of Alcock and Brown.

In response to the Argentine invasion of the Falkland Islands on 2 April 1982, No. 57 Squadron, along with No. 55 Squadron, deployed to Wideawake Airfield, Ascension Island. The squadron went on to support the complex Operation Black Buck raids, which saw multiple extreme long-range missions launched against Port Stanley Airport, East Falkland, with Avro Vulcan B.2s in May and June 1982.

In March 1984, No. LVII Squadron sent a detachment of Victors to RAF Leuchars, Fife, to participate in Exercise Teamwork 84. In 1985, the squadron helped support Panavia Tornado GR.1s of No. 27 Squadron participate in the Strategic Air Command Bomb Competition. No. 57 Squadron disbanded at RAF Marham on 30 June 1986, due to the operations in the Falklands using up a lot of the Victor fleet's remaining flying hours.

=== Training unit (1992–present) ===
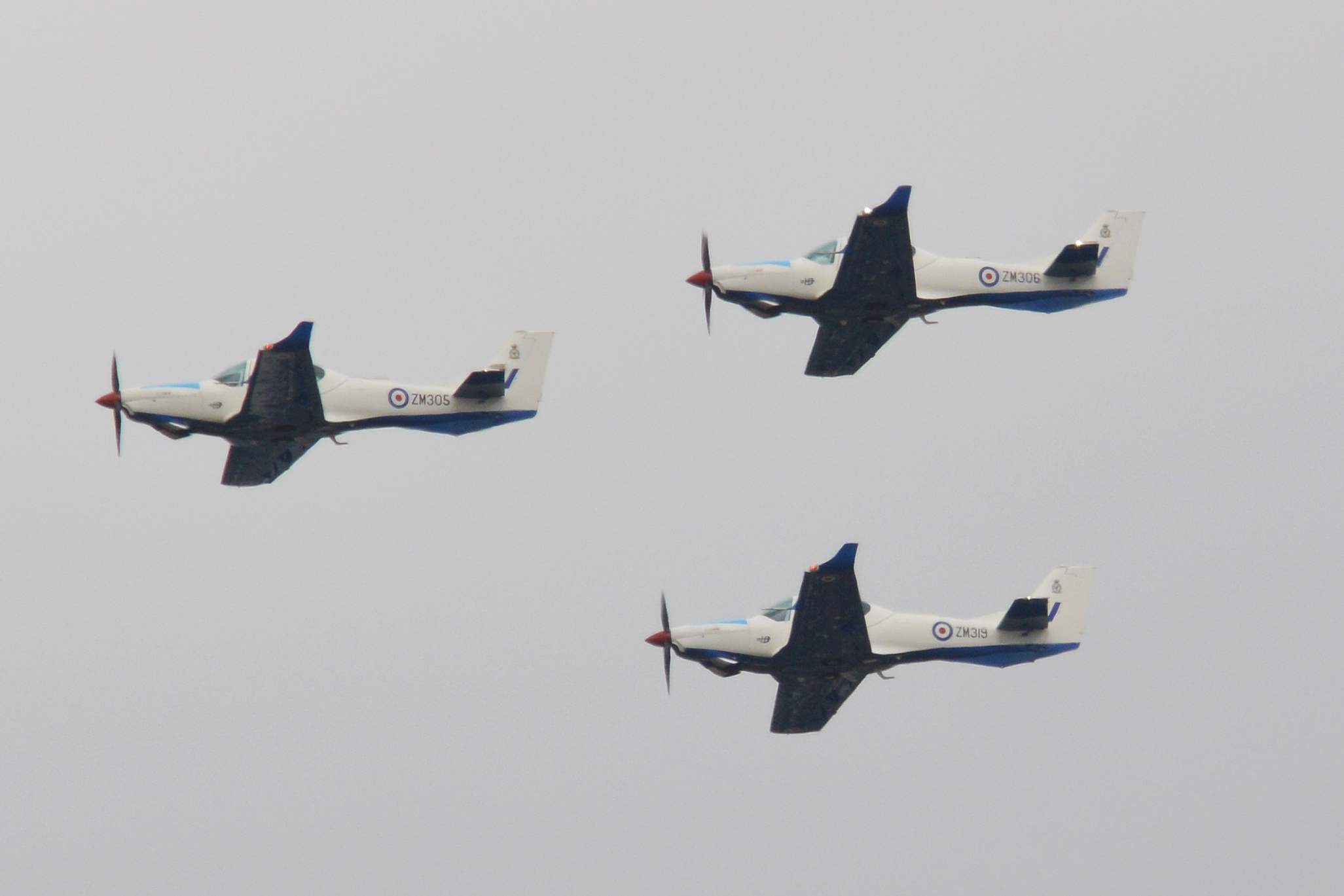
Three Grob Prefect T.1s of No. 57 (Reserve) Squadron during the RAF100 flypast over London, 10 July 2018.

==== Lockheed Hercules (1992–2002) ====
The Lockheed C-130 Hercules training unit, No. 242 OCU, at RAF Lyneham, was reassigned as No. 57 (Reserve) Squadron on 1 June 1992. The unit continued flying the Hercules until 14 March 2002 when the squadron disbanded.

==== Grob Tutor & Prefect (2008–present) ====
On 1 October 2008, another change saw No. 2 Squadron (part of 1 Elementary Flying Training School), at RAF Wyton, reassigned as the once-again re-formed No. 57 (R) Squadron, flying the Grob Tutor T.1. The squadron was then moved to RAF Cranwell, Lincolnshire, as part of No. 3 Flying Training School in 2014.

On 1 February 2018, the RAF rescinded all squadron (Reserve) suffixes, changing No. 57 (Reserve) Squadron to just No. 57 Squadron. In 2018, No. 57 Squadron converted over to the Grob Prefect T.1 as part of the UK Military Flying Training System contract. This sees student pilots from all three services undertake a 20-hour package before being streamed Fast Jet, Rotary or Multi-Engine (depending on service).

== Aircraft operated ==
- Royal Aircraft Factory B.E.2c (1916)
- Avro 504K (1916)
- Royal Aircraft Factory F.E.2d (1916–1917)
- Airco DH.4 1917–1919
- de Havilland DH.9A (1919)
- Hawker Hart (1931–1936)
- Hawker Hind (1936–1938)
- Bristol Blenheim (1938–1940)
- Bristol Blenheim IV (1940)
- Vickers Wellington IA, IC, II and III (1940–1942)
- Avro Lancaster I & III (1942–1946)
- Avro Lincoln B2 (1945–1951)
- Boeing Washington B1 (1951–1953)
- English Electric Canberra B2 (1953–1957)
- Handley Page Victor B1 (1959–1966)
- Handley Page Victor K1 (1966–1977)
- Handley Page Victor K2 (1976–1986)
- Lockheed C-130 Hercules (1992–2002)
- Grob Tutor T1 (2008–2018)
- Grob Prefect T1 (2018 – present)

== Heritage ==
The squadron's badge features a phoenix, issuant from two logs fesse-wise in saltire. It commemorating that on one occasion in France during the First World War the whole of the flying personnel became casualties within a few days, but the squadron remained in action with new personnel. It was approved by King George VI in December 1936.

The squadron's motto is Corpus non animum muto (Latin for 'I change my body not my spirit').

== Battle honours ==
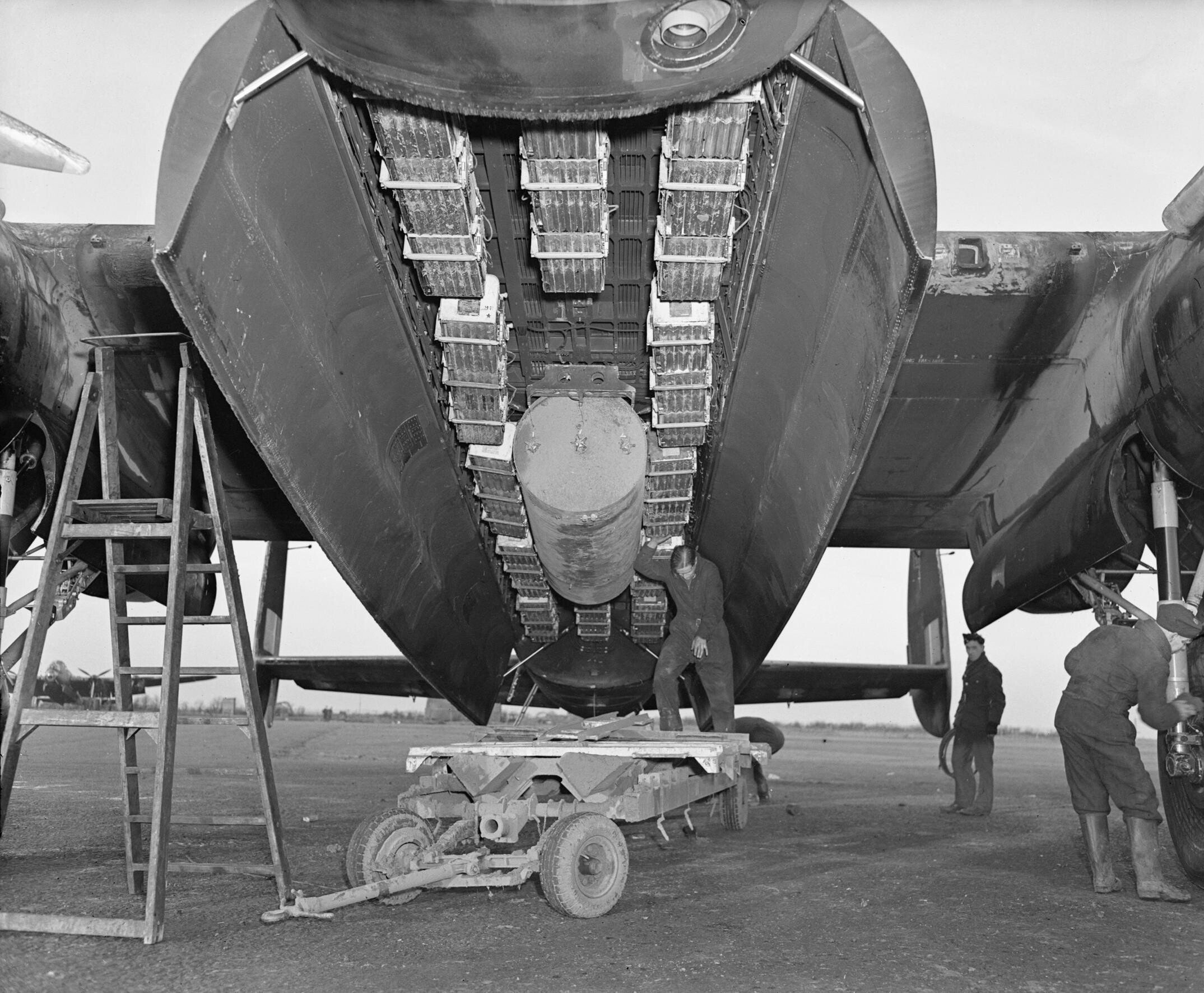
No. 57 Squadron Avro Lancaster with "Usual" area bombing load of 4000 pound "blockbuster" bomb and incendiary bombs

No. 57 Squadron has received the following battle honours. Those marked with an asterisk (*) may be emblazoned on the squadron standard.

- Western Front (1916–1918)*
- Amiens*
- France and Low Countries (1939–1940)*
- Norway (1940)*
- Channel & North Sea (1940)*
- Ruhr (1941–1943)*
- Fortress Europe (1941–1944)
- Berlin 1941–1943*
- Walcheren*
- France & Germany (1944–1945)*
- South Atlantic (1982)

== See also ==
- Alfie Fripp, longest serving and last surviving British prisoner of war
- List of Royal Air Force aircraft squadrons
