= Forde Leathley =

Irish World War I flying ace (1896–1982)

- Born: 17 February 1896; Trillick, County Tyrone, Ireland
- Died: 25 August 1982 (aged 86); Cannes, France
- Military career
- Allegiance: United Kingdom
- Branch: British Army; Royal Air Force
- Service years: 1914–1924; 1940–c.1943
- Rank: Flight lieutenant
- Units: Prince of Wales's Leinster Regiment (Royal Canadians); Royal Inniskilling Fusiliers; No. 57 Squadron RFC
- Conflicts: World War I • Western Front; World War II
- Awards: Military Cross

Flight Lieutenant Forde Leathley (17 February 1896 – 25 August 1982) was an Irish First World War flying ace credited with eight aerial victories.

== Early life and background ==
Leathley was born in Trillick, County Tyrone, where his father The Reverend James Forde Leathley was serving as rector. His father was from Kingstown, County Dublin, and his mother Elizabeth (née Stewart) was from Suffolk. They also had a daughter, Muriel.

== World War I ==
Leathley was commissioned as a second lieutenant (on probation) in the 5th Battalion, Prince of Wales's Leinster Regiment (Royal Canadians) (part of the Special Reserve) in early 1914, being confirmed in his rank on 24 July, and promoted to lieutenant on 24 October. Leathley resigned his Special Reserve commission on 17 February 1915, entering the Royal Military College as a "Gentleman Cadet", and after passing out was commissioned as a second lieutenant in the Royal Inniskilling Fusiliers on 16 June 1915. He was promoted to lieutenant on 11 April 1916.

Leathley was seconded to the Royal Flying Corps on 6 March 1917, and posted to No. 57 Squadron RFC, where he gained his first aerial victory, flying with Lieutenant C. S. Morice in a F.E.2d, by driving down out of control an Albatros D.III fighter at Buissy on 30 April, before he was officially appointed a flying officer (observer) on 8 June. All his subsequent victories were over Albatros D.V fighters and were made with Major Ernest Joy as his pilot flying an Airco DH.4. Joy and Leathley accounted for two enemy aircraft on 28 July, and then five in August; one each on the 16th and 20th, and three on the 17th.

On 26 September 1917 Leathley was awarded the Military Cross. His citation, gazetted on 8 January 1918, read:

Lieutenant Forde Leathley, Royal Inniskilling Fusiliers and Royal Flying Corps.

"For conspicuous gallantry and devotion to duty in making photographic reconnaissances and in fighting enemy aircraft. Since April he has taken part in numerous combats, during which seven hostile machines have been driven down and destroyed either by him or his Pilot, and although attacked by superior numbers of the enemy, his skill and offensive spirit have enabled him to carry out photographic reconnaissances."

By that time Leathley was training to become a pilot himself, having been granted Royal Aero Club Aviator's Certificate No. 5455 after soloing a Maurice Farman biplane at the Military School, Ruislip, on 26 November 1917, and was appointed a flying officer on 11 May 1918.

=== List of aerial victories ===
Combat record
No.	Date/Time	Aircraft/ Serial No.	Opponent	Result	Location	Notes
1	30 April 1917 @ 0945	F.E.2d (A1966)	Albatros D.III	Out of control	Buissy	Pilot: Lieutenant C. S. Morice
2	28 July 1917 @ 1830	DH.4 (A7537)	Albatros D.V	Out of control	Ingelmunster	Pilot: Major Ernest Joy
3	28 July 1917 @ 1830	DH.4 (A7537)	Albatros D.V	Destroyed	Ingelmunster	Pilot: Major Ernest Joy
4	16 August 1917 @ 1745	DH.4 (A7563)	Albatros D.V	Out of control	Houthulst	Pilot: Major Ernest Joy
5	17 August 1917 @ 0730–0732	DH.4 (A7563)	Albatros D.V	Out of control	Menin	Pilot: Major Ernest Joy
6	17 August 1917 @ 0730–0732	DH.4 (A7563)	Albatros D.V	Out of control	Menin	Pilot: Major Ernest Joy
7	17 August 1917 @ 0730–0732	DH.4 (A7563)	Albatros D.V	Out of control	West of Menin	Pilot: Major Ernest Joy
8	20 August 1917 @ 1115	DH.4 (A7564)	Albatros D.V	Out of control	East of Ypres	Pilot: Major Ernest Joy

== Inter-war career ==
Leathley remained in the RAF post-war, being granted a permanent commission with the rank of lieutenant (flying officer) on 1 August 1919. He served as an instructor at No. 4 Flying Training School at RAF Abu Sueir, Egypt, from 20 May 1921, receiving promotion to flight lieutenant on 30 June 1922, until posted to the Aircraft Depot on 21 June 1924. On 4 November 1924 Leathley was placed on half-pay, and went onto the retired list on 27 January 1925.

== World War II ==
On 5 October 1940 Leathley received an emergency commission as a lieutenant in the King's Royal Rifle Corps. He was promoted to the war substantive rank of captain, and granted the temporary rank of major on 5 November 1941 while being "specially employed". (Note: This term was often used for officers attached to one of the intelligence services. Maurice Buckmaster, head of the French section of Special Operations Executive, used the phrase as the title of one of his memoirs.)

== Personal life ==
In January 1920 Leathley became engaged to Ida Foster from London, and they were married at St George's, Hanover Square, on 27 April.
