= 74th Battalion, CEF =

Canadian infantry battalion

The 74th Battalion, CEF was an infantry battalion of the Canadian Expeditionary Force during the Great War. The battalion was authorized on 10 July 1915 and embarked for Great Britain on 29 March 1916 where it provided reinforcements to the Canadian Corps in the field. On 30 September 1916 its personnel were absorbed by the 50th Battalion (Calgary), CEF, the 51st Battalion (Edmonton), CEF, the 52nd Battalion (New Ontario), CEF and the 2nd Battalion, Canadian Mounted Rifles, CEF. The battalion was disbanded on 15 September 1917.

The 74th Battalion recruited in Peel and York Counties in Ontario and was mobilized at Camp Niagara.

The 74th Battalion had three officers commanding:

- Lt.-Col. A.J. McCausland, 27 March 1916 – 4 June 1916
- Lt.-Col. D.M. Sutherland, 4 June 1916 – 18 July 1916
- Lt.-Col. A.J. McCausland, 19 July 1916 – 25 September 1916

The 74th Battalion was awarded the battle honour THE GREAT WAR 1916.

The 74th Battalion, CEF is perpetuated by The Lorne Scots (Peel, Dufferin and Halton Regiment).

== Sources ==
- Canadian Expeditionary Force 1914-1919 by Col. G.W.L. Nicholson, CD, Queen's Printer, Ottawa, Ontario, 1962
