= 234th Battalion (Peel), CEF =

The 234th Battalion (Peel), CEF was a unit in the Canadian Expeditionary Force during the First World War. Based in Toronto, the unit began recruiting in the spring of 1916 in Peel County. After sailing to England in April 1917, the battalion was absorbed into the 12th Reserve Battalion on April 29, 1917. The 234th Battalion (Peel), CEF had one Officer Commanding: Lieut-Col. W. O. Morris.

The 234th Battalion (Peel), CEF is perpetuated by The Lorne Scots (Peel, Dufferin and Halton Regiment).
