= 76th Battalion, CEF =

Canadian infantry battalion

The 76th Battalion, CEF was an infantry battalion of the Canadian Expeditionary Force during the Great War. The 76th Battalion was authorized on 10 July 1915 and embarked for Great Britain on 23 April 1916. It provided reinforcements to the Canadian Corps in the field until 6 July 1916, when its personnel were absorbed by the 36th Battalion, CEF. The battalion was subsequently disbanded on 17 July 1917.

The 76th Battalion recruited in Barrie, Orillia and Collingwood, Ontario and was mobilized at Camp Niagara.

The 76th Battalion was commanded by Lt. Col. James Ballantine, DSO, from 25 April 1916 – 9 July 1916.

The 76th Battalion was awarded the battle honour THE GREAT WAR 1916.

The 76th Battalion, CEF is perpetuated by The Lorne Scots (Peel, Dufferin and Halton Regiment).

== Sources ==
- Canadian Expeditionary Force 1914-1919 by Col. G.W.L. Nicholson, CD, Queen's Printer, Ottawa, Ontario, 1962
