= 37th Battalion (Northern Ontario), CEF =

Canadian infantry battalion

The 37th Battalion (Northern Ontario), CEF, was an infantry battalion of the Canadian Expeditionary Force during the Great War.

== History ==
The battalion was authorized on 7 November 1914 and embarked for Great Britain on 27 November 1915. It provided reinforcements to the Canadian Corps in the field until 9 July 1916, when its personnel were absorbed by the 39th Battalion, CEF. The battalion was disbanded on 21 May 1917.

The 37th Battalion recruited in Northern Ontario was mobilized at Niagara Falls, Ontario.

The 37th battalion had one Officer Commanding, Lt-Col. C.F. Bick from 28 November 1915 to 6 July 1916.

The 37th Battalion was awarded the battle honour THE GREAT WAR, 1915–16.

== Perpetuation ==
The 37th Battalion (Northern Ontario), CEF, is perpetuated by The Lorne Scots (Peel, Dufferin and Halton Regiment).

== See also ==
- List of infantry battalions in the Canadian Expeditionary Force

== Sources ==
- Canadian Expeditionary Force 1914–1919 by Col. G.W.L. Nicholson, CD, Queen's Printer, Ottawa, Ontario, 1962
