= 4th Battalion (Central Ontario), CEF =

4th (Central Ontario) Battalion, CEF
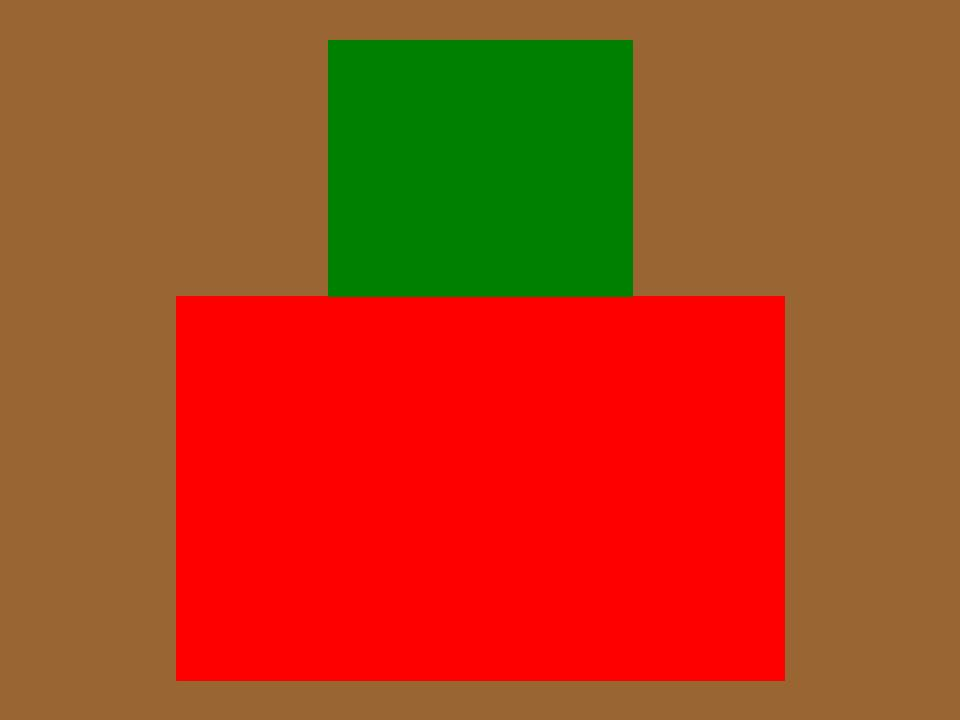
- Unit insignia
- Active: 1914–20
- Country: Canada
- Branch: Canadian Expeditionary Force
- Type: Infantry
- Size: ~ 1,000 personnel
- Part of: 1st Canadian Brigade, 1st Canadian Division
- Garrison/HQ: Central Ontario
- Engagements: First World War: Western Front
- Battle honours: Ypres and along the Western Front.

4th (Central Ontario) Battalion, CEF was an infantry battalion raised as part of the Canadian Expeditionary Force for service during the First World War. Raised in Canada in September 1914, the battalion sailed to the United Kingdom within weeks of its establishment. After a short period of training it was committed to the fighting on the Western Front, remaining in France and Belgium until the war ended. It returned to Canada in mid-1919 and after its personnel had been demobilized, the battalion was subsequently disbanded in 1920.

== History ==
The 4th Battalion of the Canadian Expeditionary Force was raised at Valcartier on 2 September 1914. Consisting of recruits from the 2nd Military District, which encompassed Aurora, Brampton, Brantford, Hamilton and Niagara Falls, the battalion's first commanding officer Lieutenant-Colonel W.S. Buell, although he was replaced by Lieutenant-Colonel R.H. Labatt after only a short period in command.

Within several weeks of its formation, the battalion embarked at Quebec on 3 October 1914 aboard the transport Tyrolia, bound for the United Kingdom. Upon arrival on 14 October 1914, the battalion's strength was 44 officers and 1,121 other ranks. A period of training in the United Kingdom followed before the battalion was transferred across the Channel to take up duty along the Western Front. After landing in France on 11 February 1915, the battalion was assigned to the 1st Canadian Infantry Brigade, which was part of the 1st Canadian Division. After being committed to the fighting, casualties mounted and the original members of the battalion were later reinforced by the 3rd Canadian Reserve Battalion. At the conclusion of hostilities, the 4th Battalion sailed to the United Kingdom on 23 March 1919, before proceeding across the Atlantic. They disembarked in Canada on 21 April 1919. The unit's personnel were subsequently demobilized in Toronto on 23 April 1919, and the battalion was disbanded officially on 15 September 1920.

== Battles ==
Throughout its involvement in the fighting on the Western Front, the 4th Battalion took part in the following battles: Ypres (1915) Passchendaele (1917); Gravenstafel; St. Julien; Festubert (1915); Mount Sorrel; Somme (1916); Flers-Courcelette; Ancre Heights; Arras (1917); Vimy (1917); Arleux; Scarpe (1918); Hill 70; Passchendaele; Amiens; Drocourt-Quéant; Hindenburg Line; Canal du Nord; Pursuit to Mons.

== Perpetuation ==
The 4th Battalion is perpetuated by the 56th Field Artillery Regiment, RCA (previously The Dufferin Rifles of Canada and later The Dufferin and Haldimand Rifles of Canada) and The Royal Hamilton Light Infantry (Wentworth Regiment).

The Lorne Scots (Peel, Dufferin and Halton Regiment) also carry some of the battalion's battle honours because of the number of soldier its predecessors The 20th Regiment, Halton Rifles and 36th Peel Regiment contributed to the 4th Battalion.

== Battle Honours ==
- Ypres 1915, 17
- Gravenstafel
- St. Julien
- Festubert, 1915
- Mount Sorrel
- Somme, 1916
- Pozieres
- Flers-Courcelette
- Ancre Heights
- Arras 1917, '18
- Vimy, 1917
- Arleux
- Scarpe, 1917, 18
- Hill 70
- Passchendaele
- Amiens
- Drocourt-Quéant
- Hindenburg Line
- Canal du Nord
- Pursuit to Mons
- France and Flanders, 1915-18

== See also ==
- List of infantry battalions in the Canadian Expeditionary Force
