= 109th Battalion (Victoria & Haliburton), CEF =

- Active: 1915–1918
- Country: Canada
- Branch: Canadian Army
- Type: Infantry
- Size: Battalion
- Engagements: World War I

Commanders
- Notable commanders: Lieutenant Colonel J.J Fee; Lieutenant Colonel J. Ballantine

The 109th Battalion CEF was a unit of the Canadian Expeditionary Force, the men of which saw active service during the First World War.

== History ==
The battalion was formed from volunteers from the Ontario counties of Victoria and Haliburton. It was commanded by Lieutenant Colonel J.J Fee and headquartered in the town of Lindsay prior to embarkation.

By the spring of 1916 the battalion had reached a strength of 1050 men and was embarked for England. On arrival in London the battalion strength was reallocated as reinforcements to replace the dead in the 20th, 21st, 28th and 124th Battalions.

== Perpetuation ==
The battalion was perpetuated by the 1st Battalion, The Victoria and Haliburton Regiment but that unit was later disbanded.

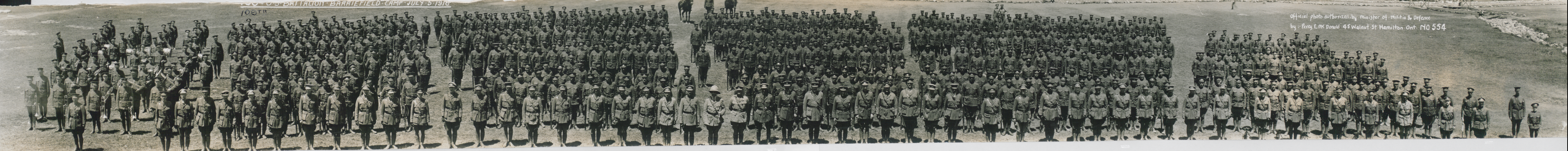

== See also ==
- List of infantry battalions in the Canadian Expeditionary Force
- The Canadian Crown and the Canadian Forces
- Military history of Canada
- History of the Canadian Army
- Canadian Forces
