= 52nd Battalion (New Ontario), CEF =

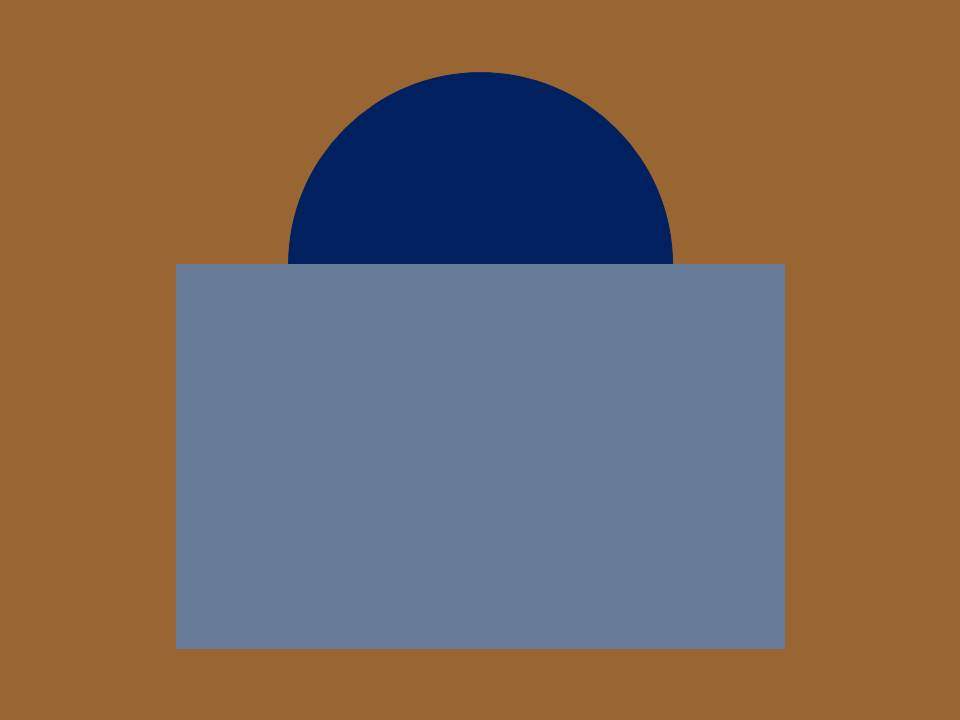
- The distinguishing patch of the 52nd Battalion (New Ontario), CEF.
- Active: 1914-1920
- Country: Canada
- Branch: Canadian Expeditionary Force
- Type: Infantry
- Size: One Battalion
- Part of: 9th Canadian Brigade, 3rd Canadian Division
- Garrison/HQ: Port Arthur, Ontario
- Engagements: First World War

Commanders
- Notable commanders: D.M. Sutherland

The 52nd Battalion (New Ontario), CEF, was an infantry battalion of the Canadian Expeditionary Force during the Great War.

== History ==
The 52nd Battalion was authorized on 7 November 1914 and embarked for Britain on 23 November 1915. It disembarked in France on 21 February 1916, where it fought as part of the 9th Canadian Brigade, 3rd Canadian Division in France and Flanders until the end of the war. The battalion was disbanded on 30 August 1920.

The 52nd Battalion recruited in Port Arthur, Kenora, Fort Frances and Dryden, Ontario and was mobilized at Port Arthur.

The 52nd Battalion had seven Officers Commanding:

- Lt-Col A.W. Hay, 23 November 1915 – 3 June 1916
- Lt.-Col. D.M. Sutherland, 27 July 1916 – 25 September 1916
- Lt.-Col. W.B. Evans, DSO, 25 September 1916 – 11 July 1917
- Maj. E.A.C. Wilcox, 11 July 1917 – 4 August 1917
- Lt.-Col. W.W. Foster, DSO, 4 August 1917 – 24 September 1918
- Lt.-Col. D.M. Sutherland, DSO, 24 September 1918 – 9 October 1918
- Lt.-Col. W.W. Foster, DSO, 9 October 1918-Demobilization

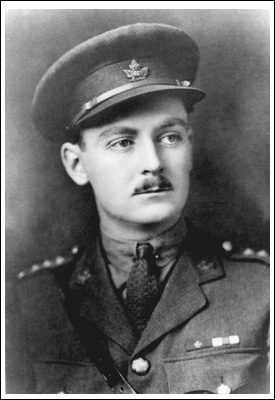
Capt. Christoper O`Kelly, VC, MC, of the 52nd Battalion (New Ontario), CEF.

One member of the 52nd Battalion was awarded the Victoria Cross. Captain Christopher O'Kelly was awarded the Victoria Cross for his actions on 26 October 1917 at Passchendaele, Belgium. He had previously been awarded the Military Cross.

== Battle honours ==
The 52nd Battalion was awarded the following battle honours:

- Mount Sorrel
- Somme, 1916
- Flers-Courcelette
- Ancre Heights
- Arras, 1917, '18
- Vimy, 1917
- HILL 70
- Ypres 1917
- Passchendaele
- Amiens
- Scarpe, 1918
- Drocourt-Quéant
- Hindenburg Line
- Canal du Nord
- Cambrai, 1918
- Valenciennes
- France and Flanders, 1916-18

== Perpetuation ==
The 52nd Battalion (New Ontario), CEF, is perpetuated by The Lake Superior Scottish Regiment.

== See also ==
- List of infantry battalions in the Canadian Expeditionary Force

== Sources ==
- Canadian Expeditionary Force 1914-1919 by Col. G.W.L. Nicholson, CD, Queen's Printer, Ottawa, Ontario, 1962
