= 116th Battalion (Ontario County), CEF =

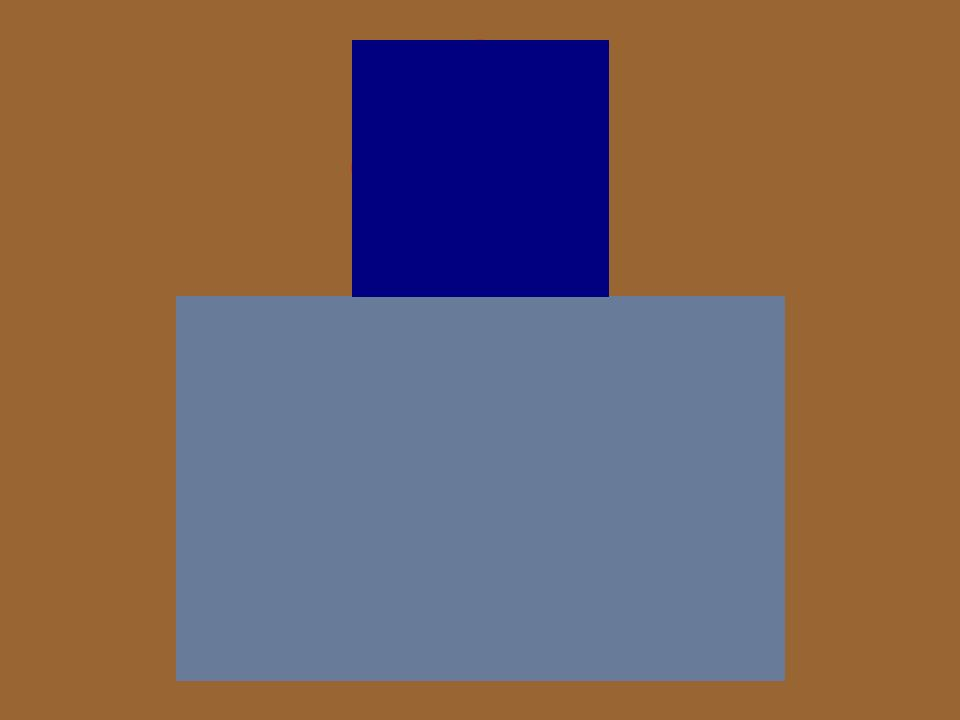
- The distinguishing patch of the 116th Battalion (Ontario County), CEF
- Active: 22 December 1915 - 30 August 1920
- Country: Canada
- Branch: Canadian Army
- Type: Infantry
- Size: Battalion
- Garrison/HQ: Uxbridge, Ontario
- Engagements: World War I

The 116th Battalion (Ontario County), CEF, was an infantry battalion of the Canadian Expeditionary Force in the Great War.

== History ==
The battalion was authorized on 22 December 1915 and embarked for Britain on 23 July 1916. From October to December 1916 it provided reinforcements for the Canadian Corps. On 11 February 1917 it disembarked in France, where it fought with the 9th Canadian Brigade, 3rd Canadian Division in France and Flanders until the end of the war. The battalion was disbanded on 30 August 1920.

The 116th Battalion recruited in Ontario County and was mobilized at Uxbridge, Ontario.

The battalion had four Officers Commanding:

- Lt.-Col. S.S. Sharpe, DSO, 23 July 1916 – 28 December 1917
- Lt.-Col. G.R. Pearkes, VC, DSO, MC, 28 December 1917 – 17 September 1918
- Lt.-Col. D. Carmichael, DSO, MC, 18 September 1918 – 26 November 1918
- Lt.-Col. G.R. Pearkes, VC, DSO, MC, 25 November 1918-Demobilization

The twice-Officer Commanding the Battalion, Lt.-Col. George R. Pearkes, would go on to a distinguished military and political career. He retired from the Canadian Army in 1945 as a Major-General, served as a Member of Parliament, including as the Minister of National Defence from 1957 to 1960 and as the Lieutenant-Governor of British Columbia from 1960 to 1968.

== Battle honours ==
The 116th Battalion was awarded the following battle honours:

- Arras, 1917–18
- VIMY 1917
- HILL 70
- YPRES 1917
- PASSCHENDAELE
- AMIENS
- Scarpe, 1918
- DROCOURT-QUEANT
- HINDENBURG LINE
- CANAL DU NORD
- CAMBRAI 1918
- Valenciennes
- FRANCE and FLANDERS 1917-18

== Perpetuation ==
The 116th Battalion is perpetuated by The Ontario Regiment (RCAC).

== See also ==
- List of infantry battalions in the Canadian Expeditionary Force
