= 129th (Wentworth) Battalion, CEF =

The 129th (Wentworth) Battalion, CEF was a unit in the Canadian Expeditionary Force during the First World War. Based in Dundas, Ontario, the unit began recruiting in late 1915 in Wentworth County. After sailing to England in August 1916, the battalion was absorbed into the 123rd and 124th Battalions, CEF and the 12th Reserve Battalion in October 1916. The 129th (Wentworth) Battalion, CEF had one Officer Commanding: Lieut-Col. W. E. S. Knowles.

The 129th Battalion was first perpetuated by The Wentworth Regiment and is now perpetuated by The Royal Hamilton Light Infantry (Wentworth Regiment).

The aviator Robert Dodds was a member of the battalion.

Levi Turkey was a member who was First Nations from Six Nations of the Grand River a part of Upper Mohawk, turtle clan.

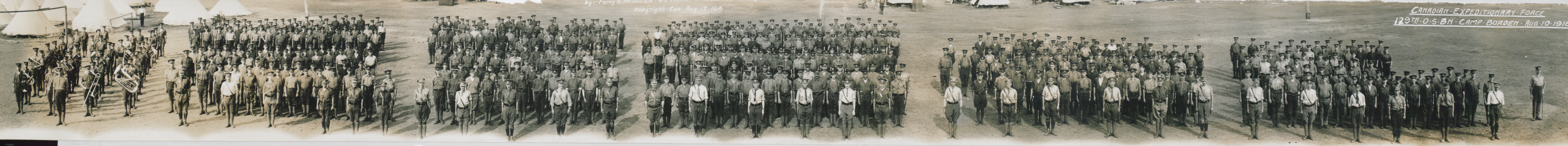
