= Royal Hamilton Light Infantry (Wentworth Regiment) =

The Royal Hamilton Light Infantry (Wentworth Regiment)
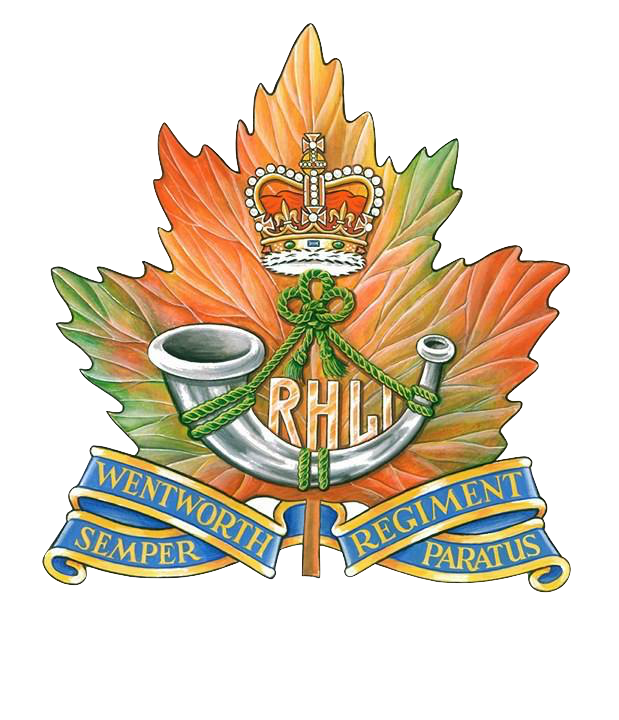
- Cap badge of the regiment
- Active: 1862–present
- Country: Province of Canada (1862–1867); Canada (1867–present)
- Branch: Canadian Army
- Type: Light infantry
- Role: Light infantry
- Size: Battalion
- Part of: 31 Canadian Brigade Group
- Garrison/HQ: John Weir Foote VC Armoury, 200 James Street North, Hamilton, Ontario
- Nickname: The Rileys
- Motto: Semper paratus (Latin for 'always ready')
- March: Quick: "Mountain Rose"
- Engagements: Fenian Raids; Second Boer War; First World War; Second World War; War in Afghanistan
- Battle honours: See #Battle honours
- Website: Official website

Commanders
- Colonel-in-chief: Vacant
- Honorary colonel: Colonel Glenna Swing
- Commanding officer: Lieutenant-Colonel Adam MacInnis, CD
- Regimental sergeant major: Chief Warrant Officer Davide Calconi, CD

The Royal Hamilton Light Infantry (Wentworth Regiment) (RHLI) is a Primary Reserve infantry regiment of the Canadian Army, based at John Weir Foote VC Armoury in Hamilton, Ontario. The RHLI is part of 31 Canadian Brigade Group, which is part of 2nd Canadian Division. The unit, formed in 1862 as "13th Battalion Volunteer Militia (Infantry), Canada", mobilized to repel a Fenian Raid in 1866, contributed volunteers for the Second Boer War, First World War and War in Afghanistan, and mobilized an overseas battalion in 1939 that fought in the Dieppe Raid and several other campaigns in northwestern Europe. On 24 May 2026 the regiment formed a tactical grouping with the Argyll and Sutherland Highlanders of Canada (Princess Louise's) as part of the Canadian Army modernization.

== Badge ==
=== Description ===
"On an autumnal maple leaf proper a bugle Argent stringed Vert enclosing the letters RHLI Or and ensigned by the Royal Crown proper, the base of the leaf surmounted by two scrolls Azure edged and inscribed 'Wentworth Regiment' and 'semper paratus' in letters Or."

=== Symbolism ===
The maple leaf represents service to Canada, and the Crown, service to the Sovereign. The regiment's light infantry heritage is symbolized by the bugle. Combined, "RHLI" and "Wentworth Regiment" are a form of the regimental title, and "semper paratus" is the motto of the regiment.

== Lineage ==
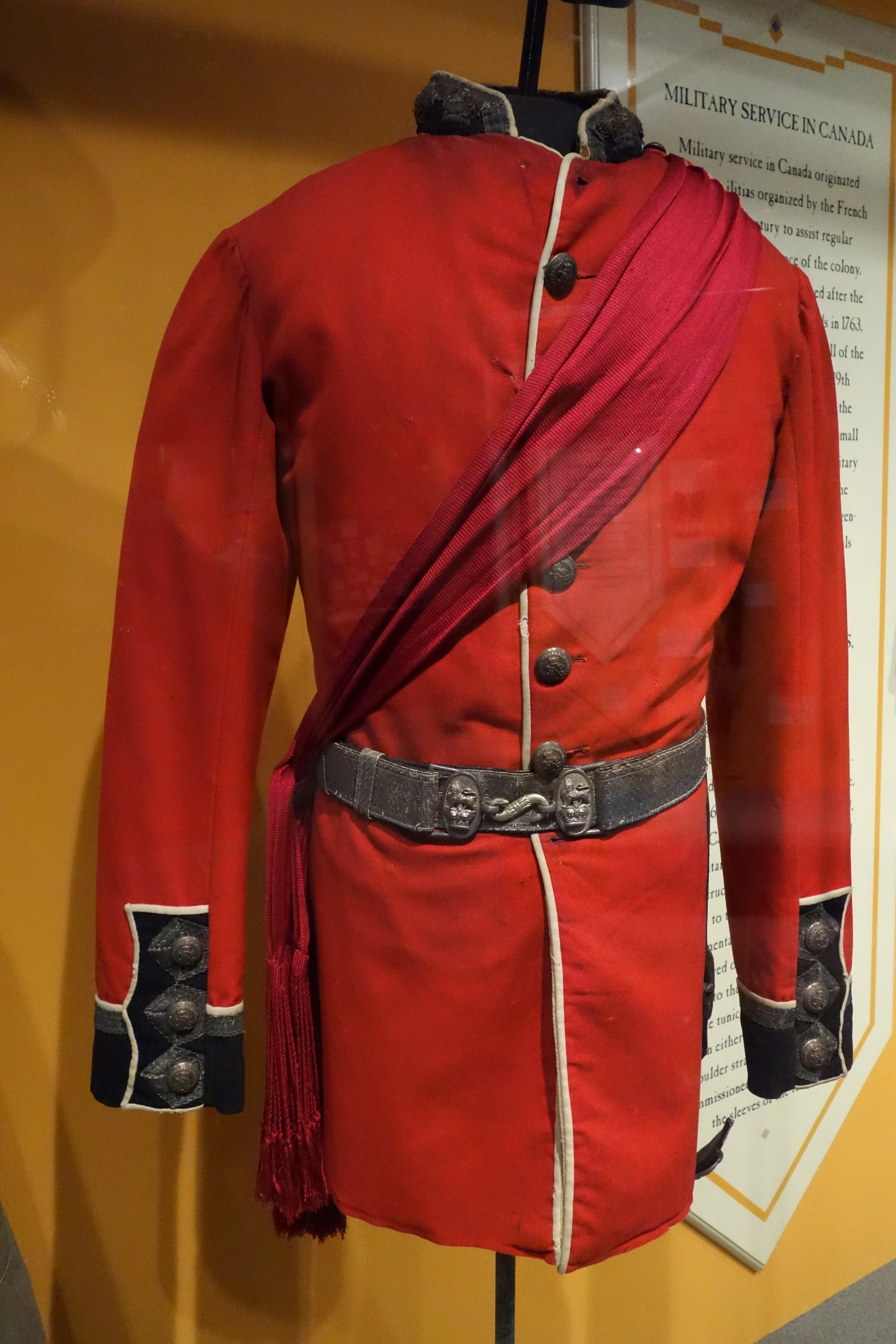
Full dress uniform from the 13th Battalion Volunteer Militia, 1862. The Royal Hamilton Light Infantry traces its lineage to the 13th Battalion.

Regimental colour

Camp flag

=== The Royal Hamilton Light Infantry ===
- The Royal Hamilton Light Infantry originated in Hamilton, Ontario on 11 December 1862 as the 13th Battalion Volunteer Militia (Infantry), Canada. It was redesignated as the 13th Regiment on 8 May 1900; as the 13th "Royal Regiment" on 3 January 1910; and as the Royal Hamilton Regiment on 1 May 1920. It was organized as a four battalion regiment with the 1st Battalion (perpetuating the 13th Battalion (Royal Highlanders of Canada), CEF) on the Non Permanent Active Militia order of battle, and the 2nd Battalion (perpetuating the 86th Battalion (Machine Gun), CEF), 3rd Battalion (perpetuating the 120th Battalion (City of Hamilton) CEF), and 4th Battalion (perpetuating the 205th Battalion (Hamilton), CEF)) on the Reserve order of battle. On 15 June 1926, the 1st Battalion was redesignated the 1st Battalion (perpetuating the 4th Battalion (Central Ontario), CEF). The reserve units were disbanded on 14 December 1936.
- The regiment was redesignated as the Royal Hamilton Light Infantry on 15 March 1927. On 15 December 1936, it amalgamated with the headquarters and three companies of the Wentworth Regiment and was redesignated as the Royal Hamilton Light Infantry (Wentworth Regiment). It was redesignated as the 2nd (Reserve) Battalion, the Royal Hamilton Light Infantry (Wentworth Regiment) on 7 November 1940 and as the Royal Hamilton Light Infantry (Wentworth Regiment) on 31 December 1945.
- On 4 May 1951, the regiment mobilized two temporary Active Force companies designated "E" and "F" Company. "E" Company was reduced to nil strength upon its personnel being incorporated into the 1st Canadian Rifle Battalion (later the 1st Battalion, the Queen's Own Rifles of Canada) for service in Germany with NATO. It was disbanded on 29 July 1953. "F" Company was initially used as a reinforcement pool for "E" Company. On 15 May 1952, it was reduced to nil strength, upon its personnel being absorbed by the newly formed 2nd Canadian Rifle Battalion (later the 2nd Battalion, the Queen's Own Rifles of Canada) for service with the United Nations in Korea.

=== The Wentworth Regiment ===
- The Wentworth Regiment originated in Dundas, Ontario on 23 May 1872 as the 77th "Wentworth" Battalion of Infantry. It was redesignated as the 77th Wentworth Regiment on 8 May 1900; and as the Wentworth Regiment on 1 May 1920. On 15 December 1936, it was amalgamated with the Royal Hamilton Light Infantry.

=== Lineage chart ===
Lineage chart

1812	2nd Regt of York Militia
1815	Disbanded
1855	Independent rifle coys
1862	13th Bn Volunteer Militia (Infy), Canada
1866	Active service (Note: March, June)	Independent infy coys
1872	77th "Wentworth" Bn of Infy (Note: 2 companies from 13th Battalion)
1900	13th Regt	77th Wentworth Regt
1910	13th "Royal Regt"
1914	4th Bn, CEF
1915	86th "Overseas" Bn, CEF	120th "Overseas" Bn, CEF	129th "Overseas" Bn, CEF
1916	Canadian MG Depot, CEF	205th "Overseas" Bn, CEF	Absorbed by 123rd and 124th "Overseas" Bn
1917	Disbanded	Absorbed by 2nd Reserve Bn	Absorbed by MG Corps, Military District No. 2
1920	Disbanded
1920	1st Bn (13th Bn, CEF), The Royal Hamilton Regt	2nd Bn (86th Bn, CEF), (Note: Reserve) The Royal Hamilton Regt	3rd Bn (120th Bn, CEF), The Royal Hamilton Regt	4th Bn (205th Bn, CEF), The Royal Hamilton Regt	1st Bn (129th Bn, CEF), The Wentworth Regt
1926	1st Bn (4th Bn, CEF), The Royal Hamilton Regt
1927	1st Bn (4th Bn, CEF), The Royal Hamilton LI	2nd Bn (86th Bn, CEF), The Royal Hamilton LI	3rd Bn (120th Bn, CEF), The Royal Hamilton LI	4th Bn (205th Bn, CEF), The Royal Hamilton LI
1936	Disbanded	Disbanded	Disbanded
1936	The Royal Hamilton LI (Wentworth Regt)
1939	The Royal Hamilton LI, CASF
1940	1st Bn, The Royal Hamilton LI, CASF	2nd (Reserve) Bn, The Royal Hamilton LI (Wentworth Regt)
1945	Disbanded	The Royal Hamilton LI (Wentworth Regt)
1951	"E" Coy, (Note: Regular Force) The Royal Hamilton LI (Wentworth Regt)	"F" Coy, The Royal Hamilton LI (Wentworth Regt)
1951	Absorbed by 1st Canadian Rifle Bn
1952	Absorbed by 2nd Canadian Rifle Bn
2012	Perpetuates 2nd Regt

== Perpetuations ==
=== War of 1812 perpetuations ===
- 2nd Regiment of York Militia

=== Great War perpetuations ===
- 4th Battalion (Central Ontario), CEF
- 86th Battalion (Machine Gun), CEF
- 120th Battalion (City of Hamilton) CEF
- 129th Battalion (Wentworth), CEF
- 205th Battalion (Hamilton), CEF)

== Alliances ==
- United Kingdom – The Rifles

== Operational history ==
=== Fenian raids ===
The 13th Battalion Volunteer Militia (Infantry), Canada was called out on active service from 8 to 31 March and from 1 to 22 June 1866 and fought on the Niagara frontier before being removed from active service on 22 June 1866.

=== South African War ===
The 13th Regiment contributed volunteers for the Canadian Contingents, principally the 2nd (Special Service) Battalion, Royal Canadian Regiment of Infantry.

=== Great War ===
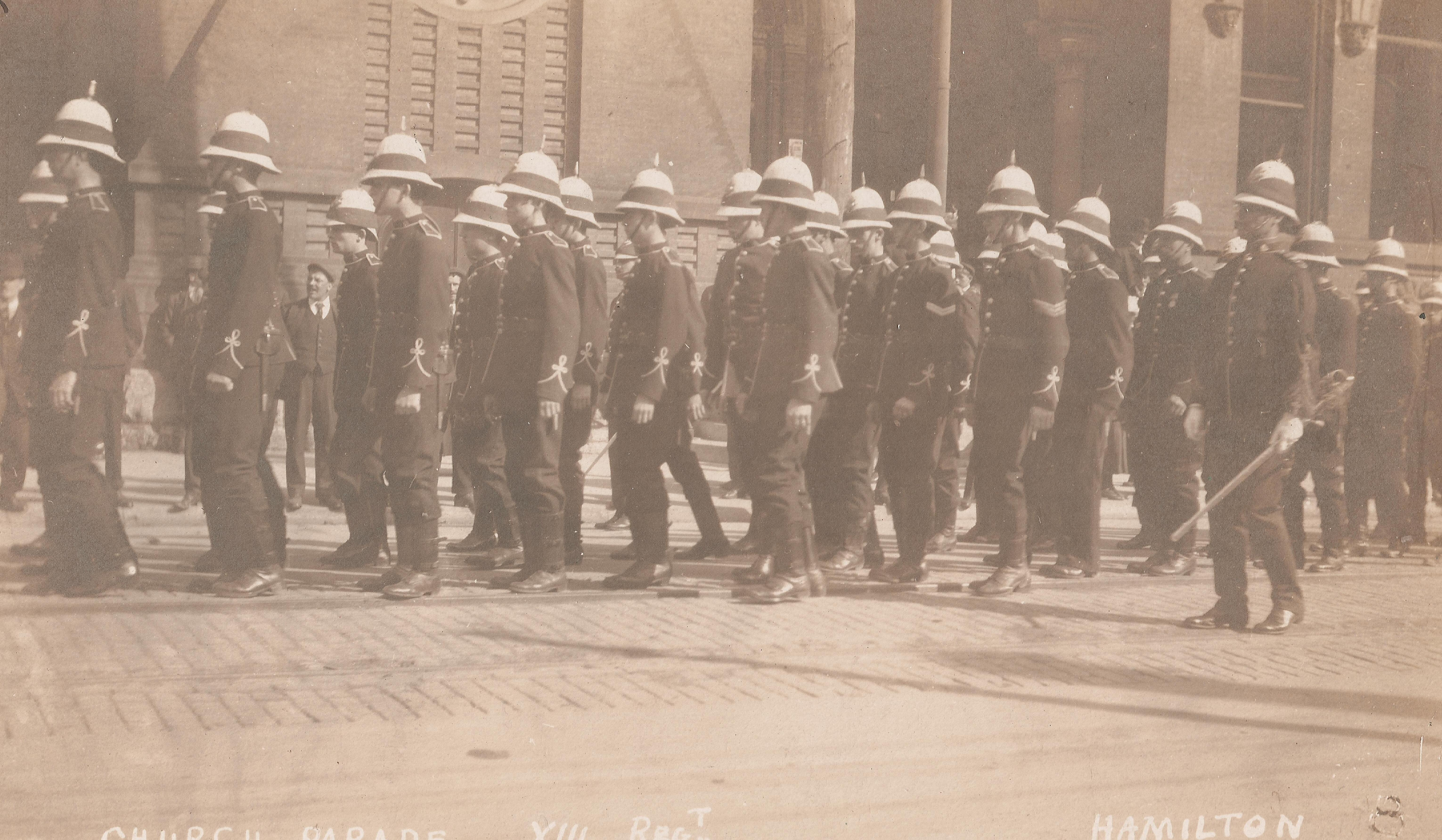
A church parade of the 13th Royal Regiment, Canadian Militia, in Hamilton in 1915

Details of the 77th Wentworth Regiment were called out on active service on 6 August 1914 for local protection duties.

The 4th Battalion (Central Ontario), CEF was authorized on 10 August 1914 and embarked for Britain on 3 October 1914. It disembarked in France on 12 February 1915, and fought as part of the 1st Infantry Brigade, 1st Canadian Division¸ in France and Flanders until the end of the war. The battalion was subsequently disbanded on 30 August 1920.

The 86th Battalion (Machine Gun), CEF was authorized on 22 December 1915 and embarked for Britain on 19 May 1916 where it provided reinforcements to the Canadian Corps in the field until 22 June 1916, when it was reorganized in Britain as the 'Canadian Machine Gun Depot, CEF'. The battalion was subsequently disbanded on 1 September 1917.

The 120th Battalion (City of Hamilton) CEF was authorized on 22 December 1915 and embarked for Britain on 14 August 1916 where it provided reinforcements to the Canadian Corps in the field until 20 January 1917, when its personnel were absorbed by the '2nd Reserve Battalion, CEF'. The battalion was subsequently disbanded on 17 July 1917.

The 129th Battalion (Wentworth), CEF was authorized on 22 December 1915 and embarked for Britain on 24 August 1916 where its personnel were absorbed by the 123rd Battalion (Royal Grenadiers), CEF and 124th Battalion (Governor General's Body Guard), CEF on 18 October 1916 to provide reinforcements to the Canadian Corps in the field. The battalion was subsequently disbanded on 21 May 1917.

The 205th Battalion (Hamilton), CEF) was authorized on 15 July 1916 and sent two reinforcing drafts overseas on 28 March and 29 April 1917. On 20 December 1916, it was reorganized in Canada as a draft-giving depot machine gun battalion, and on 31 October 1917, its personnel were absorbed by the 'Machine Gun Corps, CEF, Military District No. 2'. The battalion was subsequently disbanded on 12 July 1918.

=== Second World War ===
The regiment mobilized the Royal Hamilton Light Infantry, CASF for active service on 1 September 1939. It was redesignated as the 1st Battalion, the Royal Hamilton Light Infantry, CASF on 7 November 1940. It embarked for Britain on 22 July 1940. The battalion took part in Operation Jubilee on 19 August 1942. (General Denis Whitaker, who fought as a captain with the RHLI at Dieppe, in a 1989 interview stated, “The defeat cleared out all the dead weight. It was the best thing that ever happed to the regiment.”)

The RHLI returned to France on 5 July 1944 as part of the 4th Infantry Brigade, 2nd Canadian Infantry Division, and continued to fight in North-West Europe until the end of the war. The overseas battalion was subsequently disbanded on 31 December 1945.

=== Post-war ===
On 4 May 1951, the regiment mobilized two temporary Active Force companies designated "E" and "F" Company for service on NATO duty in Germany and United Nations duty in Korea respectively. "E" Company was reduced to nil strength upon its personnel being incorporated into the '1st Canadian Rifle Battalion'. "F" Company was initially used as a reinforcement pool for "E" Company until 15 May 1952 when it was reduced to nil strength, upon its personnel being absorbed by the newly formed '2nd Canadian Rifle Battalion'.

=== War in Afghanistan ===
The regiment contributed an aggregate of more than 20% of its authorized strength to the various Task Forces which served in Afghanistan between 2002 and 2014.

== History ==
The regiment has a long history, which includes perpetuating the 2nd Regiment of York Militia from the War of 1812. Its formal lineage descends from the 13th Regiment, formed 11 December 1862, on a general order issued by the Governor General. It has earned thirty-nine battle honours in the two world wars. Most recently, members from the regiment deployed to Afghanistan as part of the International Security Assistance Force (ISAF). They suffered their greatest single day of losses at Dieppe, France, on 19 August 1942.

The anniversary of Dieppe is recognized each year by the regiment.

=== History 1862–1913 ===
The Royal Hamilton Light Infantry has a rich history in Hamilton and Wentworth County. The regiment has two direct antecedents, and indirect antecedents include the 1st and 2nd Companies of Volunteer Rifles (Hamilton), formed in 1855, and the Volunteer Highland Company (No. 3 Company) formed in 1856.

The RHLI's earliest direct ancestor is the 13th Battalion of Volunteer Militia established in 1862, which along with the 2nd Battalion the Queen's Own Rifles are modern Canada's oldest fighting regiments, having first seen combat in June 1866 at the Battle of Ridgeway against an invading Irish American Fenian insurgent army composed of better armed and more experienced recent civil war veterans. The regimental cap badge still bears the supposedly unlucky number from its oldest official antecedent. When the 13th Battalion first saw action at the Battle of Ridgeway it took heavy casualties and was forced to fall back along with the Queen's Own Rifles. The 13th Battalion commanding officer Lt. Colonel Alfred Booker who was in command of the brigade deployed in the battle was blamed for the disaster.

In 1870, another contingent from the battalion served in Manitoba during the Red River Rebellion. The regiment also traces ancestry to the 77th (Wentworth) Battalion of Volunteer Militia. Founded under that name in 1872, it was renamed the 77th Wentworth Regiment in 1900.

Between 1899 and 1902, during the Boer War, many members of the 13th served in South Africa as members of the 2nd (Special Service) Battalion of the Royal Canadian Regiment and the 1st Canadian Mounted Rifles. Not asked to mobilize for the war, the 13th Battalion remained in Canada and was redesignated 13th Regiment in 1900 and 13th Royal Regiment in 1910.

=== History 1914–1938 ===
When the Great War began in 1914, Colonel Sam Hughes, Canada's Minister of Militia, scrapped the original national mobilization plan and asked the commanding officers of Militia units for volunteers to serve with battalions of the Canadian Expeditionary Force (CEF). Consequently, many members of the 13th Royal Regiment went overseas with the 4th Battalion, CEF, part of the famous First Contingent. Throughout the war, the unit served as a depot regiment that enrolled and trained men before despatching them to deploying CEF battalions. The CEF was not the only destination, either; the Royal Flying Corps accepted 82 men from the 13th, and 81 went to the Royal Canadian Naval Volunteer Reserve. Locally raised CEF battalions that received soldiers from the 13th included the 19th Battalion, CEF (145 men), 36th Battalion, CEF (124 men), 76th Battalion, CEF (506 men), 86th (Machine Gun) Battalion, CEF (600 men), 120th (City of Hamilton) Battalion, CEF (625 men) and the 205th (Tiger) Battalion, CEF (704 men). Of these, the 120th (City of Hamilton) Battalion CEF had the closest affiliation with the 13th Royal Regiment, so on 28 May 1916, that battalion formally accepted the regiment's colours and took them overseas. The colours were laid up in Westminster Abbey until 5 March 1919, when the Dean of Westminster returned them to veterans of the 120th (City of Hamilton) Battalion, which was broken up to reinforce other CEF battalions in 1917.

In the interwar period, the Canadian Militia underwent two major reorganizations (in 1920 and again in 1936) and several minor ones. The Hamilton area did not escape, and in 1920 the two most significant RHLI antecedents acquired new names: The Royal Hamilton Regiment and The Wentworth Regiment. In 1927, the former became the Royal Hamilton Light Infantry, and the final reorganization in 1936 brought all but one company of the Wentworth Regiment into the RHLI, which then received its current title: The Royal Hamilton Light Infantry (Wentworth Regiment). To this day, the regiment is informally known as the Rileys.

=== History 1939–1945 ===
On the outbreak of the Second World War in September 1939, all the units of the Non-Permanent Active Militia of Canada were mobilized for overseas service. (This was not done in 1899 or 1914 because the original terms of sovereignty under the British North America Act-amended by the Statute of Westminster in 1931-did not include authority to deploy troops outside Canadian territory.) The Rileys were mobilized with the Canadian Active Service Force on 1 September 1939, reinforced from the 2nd Battalion at the regiment's home station, which began recruiting for home defence in early 1940. In November 1940, the active service battalion was redesignated the 1st Battalion, RHLI.

The 1st Battalion was assigned to the 4th Infantry Brigade in the 2nd Canadian Infantry Division. The battalion saw combat for the first time at Dieppe on August 19, 1942. Of the 582 soldiers who landed that morning, only 102 (18 percent) were not among the casualties: 197 killed, 174 captured and 194 wounded (including 85 also captured). The Dieppe survivors suffered great physical trauma and psychological distress as a result of the battle and the loss of so many of their friends and comrades in a battle that lasted only about eight hours.

The most highly decorated member of the battalion was the chaplain, Honorary Captain the Reverend John Foote, who remained at Dieppe with his wounded and captured comrades rather than accept evacuation to Britain. Padre Foote was nominated for the Victoria Cross while still a prisoner of war; the award was made after VE Day.

The 2nd Canadian Division came under command of the newly formed II Canadian Corps in Britain, and after almost two years of training after Dieppe, returned to France after D-Day to fight through the Battle of Normandy from early July onwards. During Operation Spring, the Rileys earned the distinction of being the only assault unit to hold their objective (the village of Verrières). During the winter of 1944-45, the Rileys fought through the Battle of the Scheldt and the Rhineland, and on V-E Day was deep into Germany.

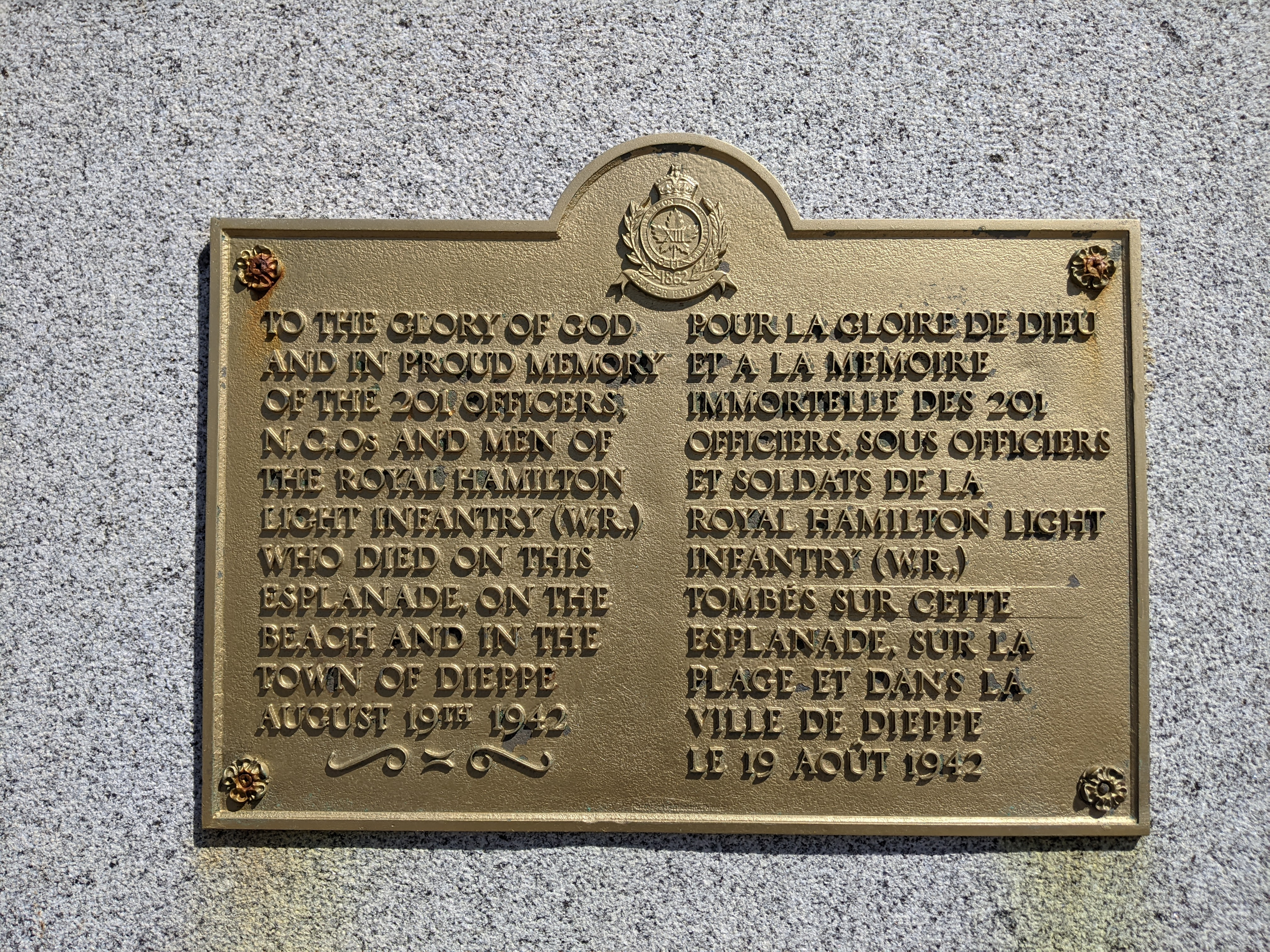
Dieppe Raid memorial plaque

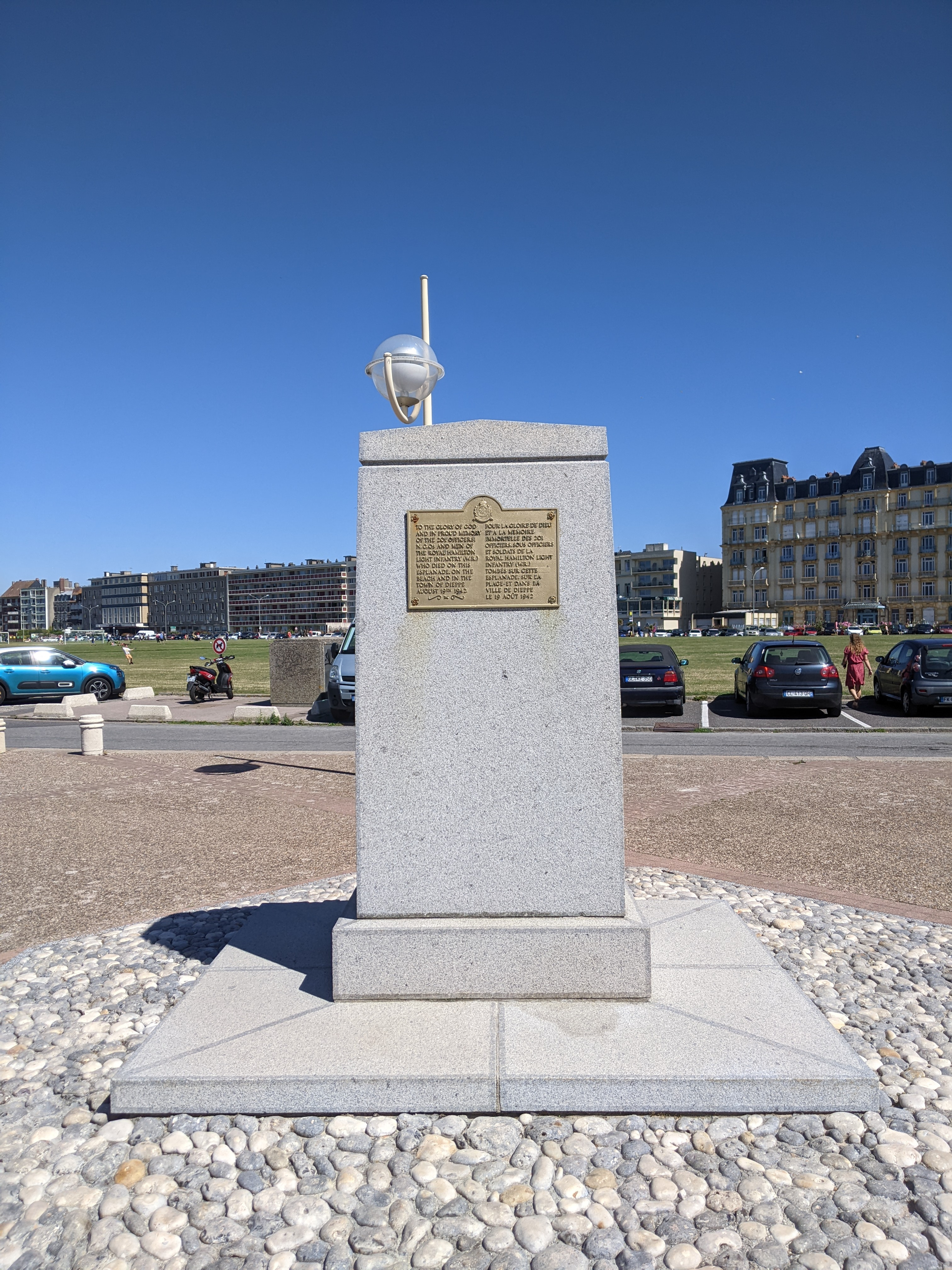
Dieppe Memorial

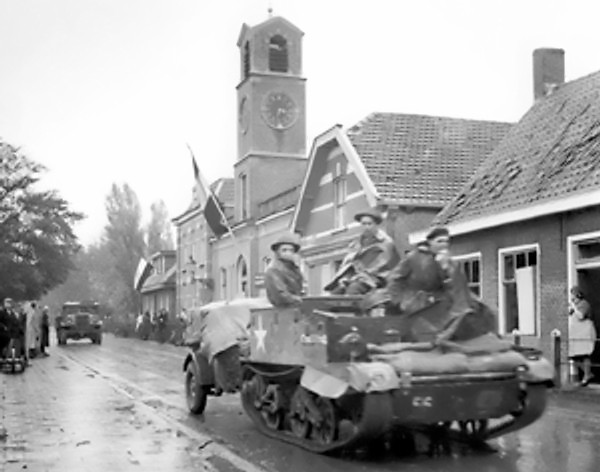
A Universal Carrier of the 1st Battlion moves through the Dutch village of Krabbendijke on the Beveland Causeway, 27 October 1944

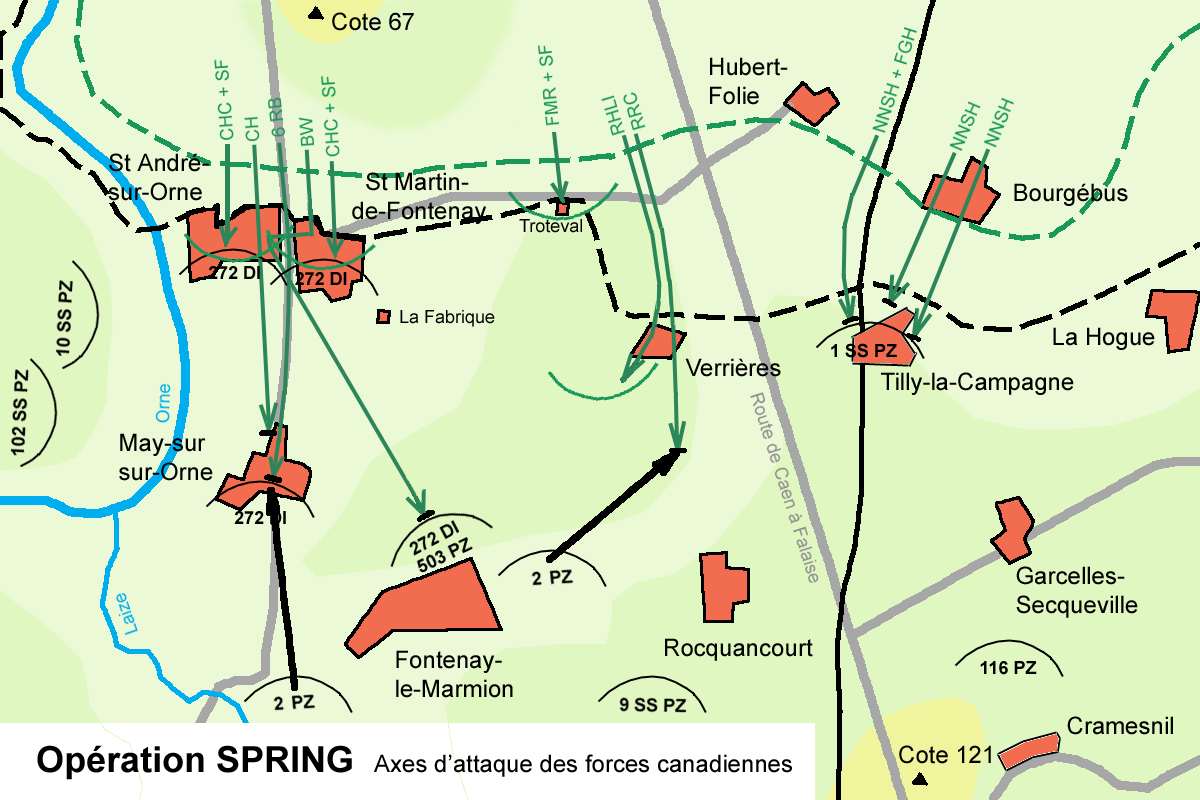
The Royal Hamilton Light Infantry SF

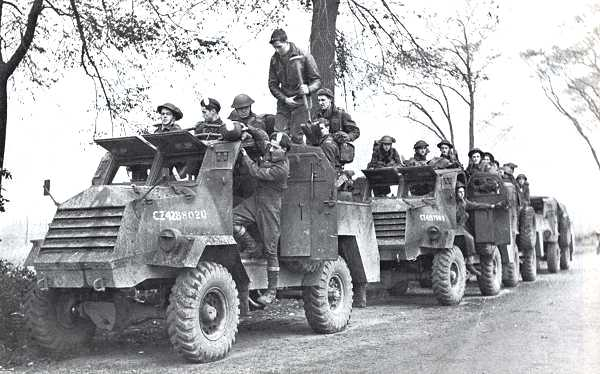
The 1st Battalion moves towards South Beveland during the Battle of the Scheldt

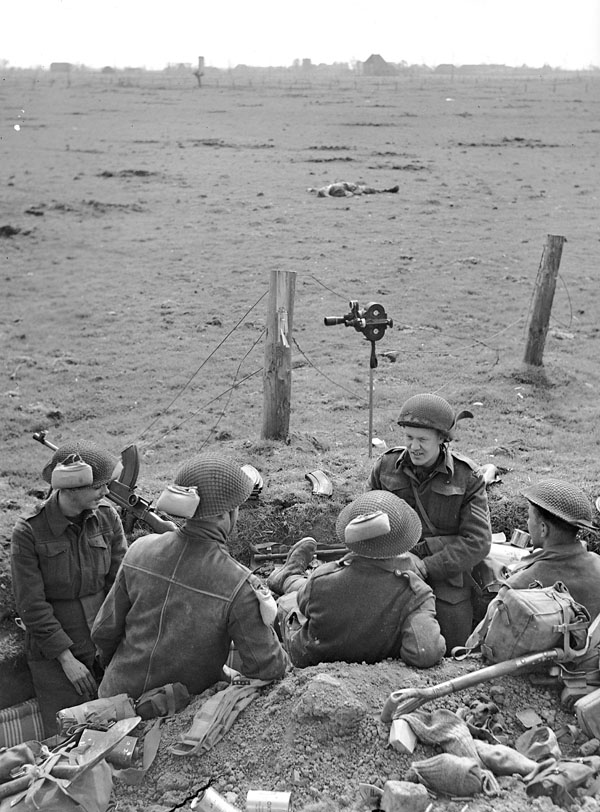
Sergeant F. Beal (fourth from left), Canadian Army Film and Photo Unit, talking with infantrymen of the 1st Battalion, Speldrop, Germany, 24 March 1945.

=== History 1945–1999 ===
In the post-war period, the regular battalion was demobilized and the reserve battalion consequently lost its number. It looked like the RHLI would revert to the genteel neglect of the interwar period, until the Cold War interrupted. Some Rileys served in the United Nations Special Force in the Korean War and in 1955 the regiment was represented in the 27th Brigade that served on NATO duty in West Germany.

At home, its armoury was renamed in honour of Padre Foote, VC. In 1978, Prince Philip, Duke of Edinburgh, was appointed colonel-in-chief of the regiment, an appointment he held until his death in 2021. The RHLI, formerly part of the Hamilton Militia District, became part of Land Force Central Area's 31 Canadian Brigade Group in the 1990s.

The town of Dieppe, France, set aside a small park at the western end of the esplanade in which it erected a memorial of its own. Standing in the centre of the Square du Canada (Canada Square), the Dieppe-Canada Monument is a testimony to the association between Canadians and Normans which has existed since Samuel de Champlain sailed to found New France. The names of people and events which have linked Canada and Normandy over the centuries are recorded on the monument. Mounted on the wall behind it is a plaque that commemorates the Raid on Dieppe:

On 19 August 1942 on the beaches of Dieppe our Canadian cousins marked with their blood the road to our final liberation foretelling thus their victorious return on 1 September 1944. (translation from the French)

=== Recent activities ===
Members of the regiment have augmented Regular Force contingents on many operations including serving in the Balkans with United Nation forces (UNPROFOR) in the early 1990s and NATO from 1995–2006. Over the past decades members have also served in; Cyprus, the Golan Heights, Bosnia, Sierra Leone, Congo, Haiti, Sudan, Dubai, Afghanistan, Kuwait, Lebanon, Iraq, Ukraine and Latvia. They were also on alert for the feared millennial or Y2K crisis, which was resolved without adverse effect on society.

The City of Hamilton dedicated Dieppe Memorial Park in the Hamilton Beach neighbourhood on 19 August 2003, the 61st anniversary of the Dieppe Raid. Among the 250 invited guests and 1,000 onlookers were the Lieutenant-Governor of Ontario and 18 of the 24 Riley Dieppe veterans known to survive.

In 2017 the RHLI received the StAR (Strengthening the Army Reserve) Mission Task of Influence Activities (IA). This is a mixture of Psychological Operations (PSYOPS) and Civil-Military Cooperation (CIMIC).

Current parade strength is approximately 200-250 all ranks, making the RHLI one of the largest reserve regiments in the CAF. The RHLI currently consists of; one rifle company, "B" Company (Hamilton), an IA Company, "D" Company (Burlington) and an administration company, "A" Company, also at battalion headquarters in Hamilton. Battalion structures are maintained throughout the militia to allow for expansion in time of war.

=== Serving in Afghanistan ===
Officers and Soldiers from the RHLI deployed to Afghanistan as part of the Canadian Forces contribution to the International Security Assistance Force (ISAF). This is the first time since the Second World War serving members from the regiment have taken part in combat operations. Most notably this included Operation Medusa in 2006. Members from the RHLI in Afghanistan served with Infantry Platoons, CIMIC & PSY OPS teams, Provincial Reconstruction Team (PRT), Force Protection Units, Helicopter Door Gunner Sections, and Canadian Special Operations Forces.

== Battle honours ==
Regimental colour

Battle honours in small capitals are for large operations and campaigns and those in lowercase are for more specific battles. Bold type indicates honours authorized to be emblazoned on the regimental colour.

War of 1812
- Defence of Canada – 1812–1815 – Défense du Canada
- Detroit
- Queenston
- Niagara
South African War
South Africa, 1899–1900
First World War
- **Ypres, 1915, '17**
- Gravenstafel
- **St. Julien**
- **Festubert, 1915**
- Mount Sorrel
- **Somme, 1916**
- Pozières
- Flers–Courcelette
- Ancre Heights
- **Arras, 1917, '18**
- **Vimy, 1917**
- Arleux
- Scarpe, 1917, '18
- Hill 70
- **Passchendaele**
- **Amiens**
- Drocourt–Quéant
- **Hindenburg Line**
- Canal du Nord
- **Pursuit to Mons**
- France and Flanders, 1915–18
Second World War
- **Dieppe**
- **Verrières Ridge–Tilly-la-Campagne**
- **Falaise**
- Falaise Road
- **Clair Tizon**
- **Forêt de la Londe**
- The Scheldt
- **Woensdrecht**
- South Beveland
- The Rhineland
- **Goch–Calcar Road**
- **The Hochwald**
- **Xanten**
- Twente Canal
- **Groningen**
- Oldenburg
- North-West Europe, 1942, 1944–1945
South-West Asia
Afghanistan

== Royal Canadian Army Cadets ==
The RHLI has two affiliated Royal Canadian Army Cadets corps. One corps in Hamilton (62 Canadian Cadet Corps) and one corps in Burlington (2379 Canadian Cadet Corps). Both corps have an outstanding training program as well as having had several cadets attend the Royal Military College of Canada or Civilian University - Regular Officers Training Program and join the Canadian Armed Forces.

== Notable soldiers ==
- Isaac Buchanan, founder of the 13th Battalion Volunteer Militia (Infantry) and the unit's first commanding officer.
- Denis Whitaker, a prewar professional football player, rose to command the 1st Battalion of the regiment in the Second World War. After the war, he rose to the rank of brigadier and published many books on Canadian military history with his wife Shelagh.
- Rev. John Wier Foote, VC, was awarded the Victoria Cross during the battle of Dieppe for rescuing fallen Allied soldiers and surrendering so as to assist the captured and injured Allied soldiers during their wait for liberation.
- William Merrifield, Victoria Cross recipient
- John M. Rockingham, Second World War Commanding Officer. Went on to command Canadian Special Force in Korea and retired from the army as a major general.

== Traditions ==
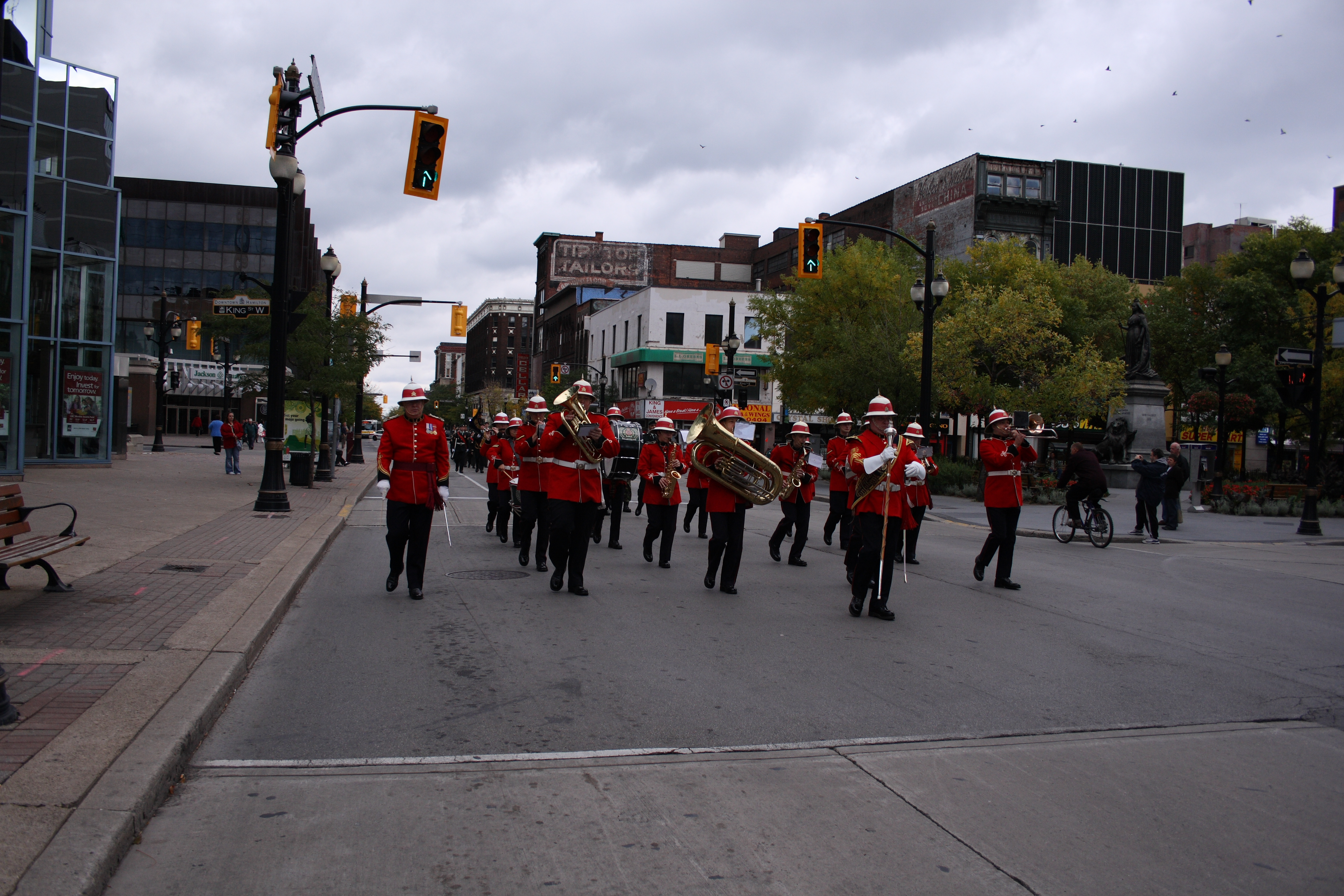
The RHLI Band marching from their barracks to the regimental church service.

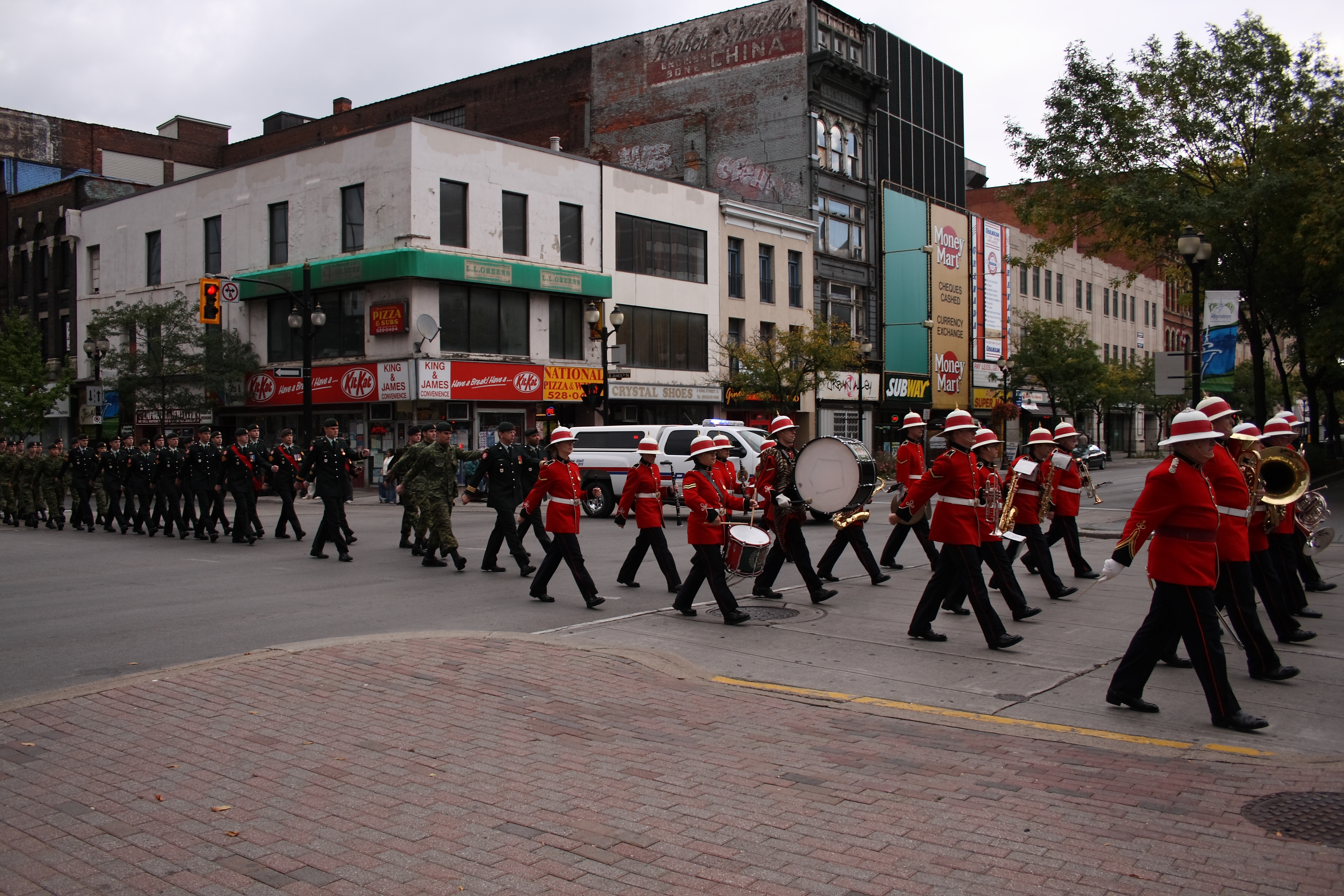
RHLI Church Parade 2007
- Soldiers of the regiment are colloquially known individually and collectively as Rileys referring phonetically to RHLI.
- Exercise Resolute Riley: held annually since 1997 at Valens Conservation Area in Waterdown. This event, which historically takes place the second weekend in September, tests soldiers physical fitness as well as teamwork while completing a swamp crossing, cross-country run, rucksack march and water crossing. The winning team is awarded the Nicolazzo Trophy (named after Master Corporal Frank Nicolazzo, who was killed in 1996).
- Silver Cap Badge: This honour is awarded annually to the top soldier within the following rank groups; private/corporal, master corporal, sergeant and junior officer. Awarded during the Regimental Christmas Dinner, the Silver Cap Badge is then worn by the recipient for one year.
- RHLI 13th Battalion Ceremonial Guard: The regiment maintains a ceremonial guard used to perform public duties on behalf of the regiment. Known as The RHLI 13th Battalion Ceremonial Guard, it demonstrate the weapons, tactics (field formations and maneuvers) and foot drill of the period when the regiment and country were formed. All members of the Guard are serving or retired members of the RHLI. All serving soldiers of the Guard have their primary duties with the Rifle & Information Operations Companies of The RHLI. The 13th BnCG remains a secondary duty. Raised in 2008, it performs at a variety of ceremonies such as the Fortissimo Sunset Ceremony or any Canada Day event in the vicinity.

== Royal Hamilton Light Infantry Heritage Museum ==
Royal Hamilton Light Infantry Heritage Museum
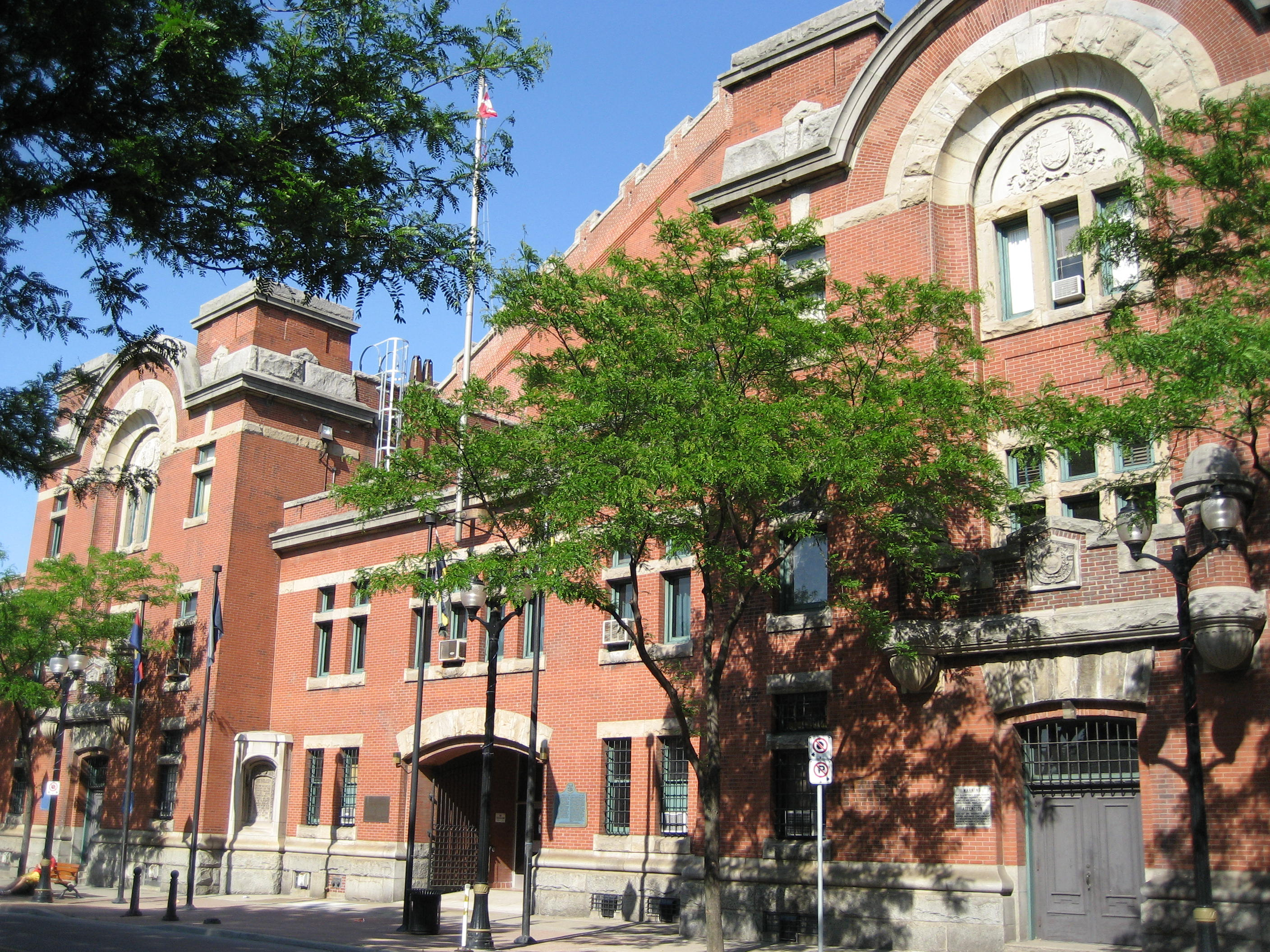
- Location: John Weir Foote VC Armoury; 200 James Street North; Hamilton, Ontario
- Type: Regimental museum
- Website: Museum webpage

The museum perpetuates the history of the regiment as well as preserves and displays relevant memorabilia. The museum is affiliated with: CMA, CHIN, OMMC and Virtual Museum of Canada.

== Media ==
=== Books ===
- Presentation of colours by His Excellency Major-General Georges P. Vanier, the Governor-General of Canada to the Royal Hamilton Light Infantry (Wentworth Regiment) Hamilton, Ontario, 30 June 1962 (Hamilton, Ont. : The Regiment, 1962)
- Greenhous, Brereton, ed. Semper Paratus: The History of The Royal Hamilton Light (Wentworth Regiment) 1862-1977. Hamilton, Ont.: The RHLI Historical Association, 1977.

=== Music ===
- Memory: valse and Happy steps: polka for the piano by Katharine T. Fuller were dedicated by permission to Col. Gibson & officers of the XIII Battalion, the Royal Hamilton Light Infantry (Wentworth Regiment). They were published by I. Suckling & Sons, Toronto circa 1892.
- Soldiers of the Empire by Harry H. Marsales & J. Benj. Burns was dedicated to Lt.-Col. E.E.W. Moore, the Officers, Non Commissioned Officers and Men of the XIII Regt., the Royal Hamilton Light Infantry (Wentworth Regiment). It was published in Toronto by Whaley, Royce & Co., circa 1905.

=== Other media ===
- The Royal Hamilton Light Infantry are featured as a playable unit in Day of Infamy (video game), by American developer and publisher New World Interactive, alongside The Argyll and Sutherland Highlanders of Canada (Princess Louise's), Princess Patricia's Canadian Light Infantry, and Seaforth Highlanders.

== Order of precedence ==
Preceded by The Royal Regiment of Canada	Royal Hamilton Light Infantry (Wentworth Regiment)	Succeeded by The Princess of Wales' Own Regiment
