= Royal Regiment of Canada =

Coordinates: 43.6369°N 79.4080°W

The Royal Regiment of Canada
- Badge of the regiment
- Active: 1862–present
- Country: Province of Canada (1862–1867); Canada (1867–present)
- Branch: Canadian Army
- Type: Infantry
- Size: One battalion
- Part of: 32 Canadian Brigade Group
- Garrison/HQ: Fort York Armoury, Toronto
- Nickname: Royals
- Mottos: Ready aye ready; Nec aspera terrent (Latin for 'And difficulties do not daunt')
- March: Quick: "The British Grenadiers"/"Here's to the Maiden"; Slow: "Royal Regiment of Canada – Regimental Slow March"
- Engagements: Fenian Raids; North-West Rebellion; Second Boer War; First World War; Second World War; War in Afghanistan
- Battle honours: See #Battle honours
- Website: canada.ca/en/army/corporate/4-canadian-division/the-royal-regiment-of-canada.html

Commanders
- Commanding officer: LCol Adam West
- Regimental sergeant major: CWO Mariangeles Najlis
- Colonel-in-chief: King Charles III

British Grenadiers & Here's to the Maiden
The regimental quick march of the Royal Regiment of Canada as performed by their Regimental Band, originally recorded in 1996 on their album Footsteps in Time

The Royal Regiment of Canada is a Primary Reserve infantry regiment of the Canadian Army. The regiment is based in Toronto, Ontario, and forms part of the 4th Canadian Division's 32 Canadian Brigade Group.

The ceremonial dress uniform of the Royal Regiment of Canada is a scarlet tunic, bearskin, and a red-over-white plume, similar to the former Canadian Guards regiment.

== Lineage ==
Regimental colour

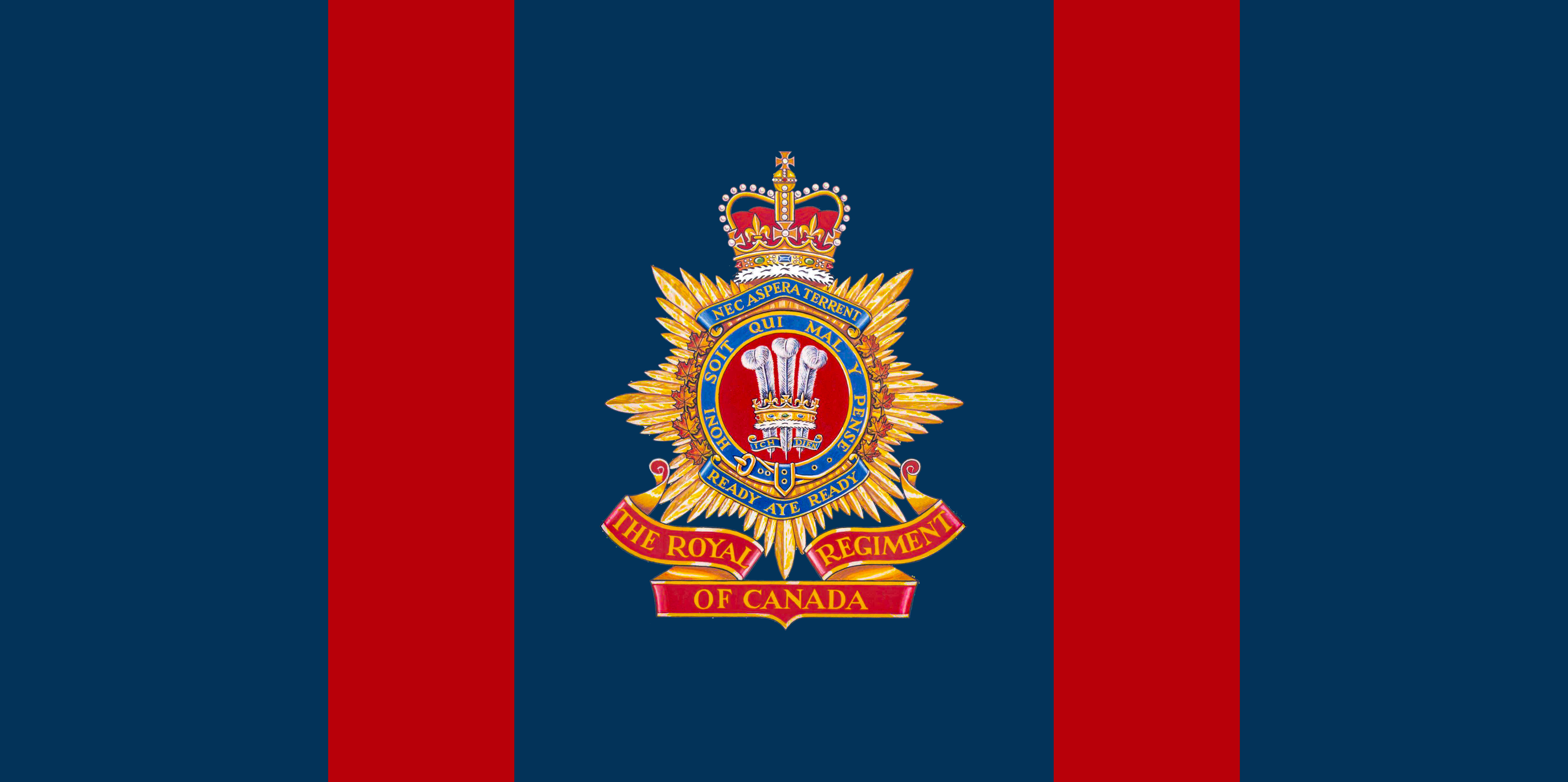
Camp flag

=== Royal Grenadiers ===
- Originated 21 December 1861 in Toronto, Ontario as The Toronto Engineers and Mechanics Rifle Corps
- First official designation 14 March 1862 as the 10th Battalion Volunteer Militia Rifles, Canada
- Redesignated 21 November 1862 as the 10th Battalion Volunteer Militia (Infantry), Canada
- Redesignated 10 April 1863 as the Tenth or "Royal Regiment of Toronto Volunteers"
- Reorganized 5 November 1880 with the appointment of Colonel Grasett and retirement of Colonel Shaw
- Redesignated 5 August 1881 as the 10th Battalion "Royal Grenadiers"
- Redesignated 8 May 1900 as the 10th Regiment "Royal Grenadiers"
- Served in the Great War as the 123rd Battalion, Royal Grenadiers, and supplied trained hundreds of infantry officers and men to several Canadian Battalions
- Redesignated 1 May 1920 as The Royal Grenadiers
- Amalgamated 15 December 1936 with The Toronto Regiment

=== The Toronto Regiment ===
- Originated 1 May 1920 in Toronto, Ontario
- Formed principally from the 3rd Battalion (Toronto Regiment), CEF, of the Great War
- Amalgamated 15 December 1936 with the Royal Grenadiers.

=== The Royal Regiment of Canada ===
- Amalgamated 15 December 1936 the Royal Grenadiers with The Toronto Regiment and redesignated as The Royal Regiment of Toronto Grenadiers
- Redesignated 11 February 1939 as the Royal Regiment of Canada
- Supplemented 7 November 1940 by the formation of the 2nd Battalion, the Royal Regiment of Canada for home service

=== Chart ===
Lineage chart

1862	The 10th Bn Volunteer Militia Rifles, Canada
1862	The 10th Bn Volunteer Militia (Infy), Canada
1863	Tenth or "Royal Regt of Toronto Volunteers"
1866	Active service (Note: March–June)
1881	10th Bn "Royal Grenadiers"
1885	Active service (Note: Detachments, April–July)
1900	10th Regt "Royal Grenadiers"
1914	3rd Bn, CEF
1915	58th "Overseas" Bn, CEF	123rd "Overseas" Bn, CEF	124th "Overseas" Bn, CEF
1916	170th "Overseas" Bn, CEF	204th "Overseas" Bn, CEF
1916	Absorbed by 169th "Overseas" Bn, CEF
1917	123rd Canadian Pioneer Bn, CEF	124th Canadian Pioneer Bn, CEF	Absorbed by 2nd Reserve Bn
1918	Absorbed by 7th, 8th and 9th Canadian Engineer Bn	Absorbed by 10th, 11th and 12th Canadian Engineer Bn
1920	Disbanded	Disbanded
1920	1st Bn (58th Bn, CEF), The Royal Grenadiers	2nd Bn (123rd Bn, CEF), (Note: Reserve) The Royal Grenadiers	3rd Bn (198th Bn, CEF), The Royal Grenadiers	1st Bn (3rd Bn, CEF), The Toronto Regt	2nd Bn (124th Bn, CEF), The Toronto Regt	3rd Bn (170th Bn, CEF), The Toronto Regt	4th Bn (204th Bn, CEF), The Toronto Regt
1926	3rd Bn, The Royal Grenadiers
1936	Disbanded	Disbanded	Disbanded	Disbanded	Disbanded
1936	The Royal Regt of Toronto Grenadiers
1939	The Royal Regt of Canada, CASF	The Royal Regt of Canada
1940	1st Bn, The Royal Regt of Canada, CASF	2nd Bn, The Royal Regt of Canada
1945	Disbanded	The Royal Regt of Canada

== Perpetuations ==
=== The Great War ===
- 3rd Battalion (Toronto Regiment), CEF
- 58th Battalion, CEF
- 123rd Battalion (Royal Grenadiers), CEF
- 124th Battalion (Governor General's Body Guard), CEF
- 170th Battalion (Mississauga Horse), CEF
- 204th Battalion (Beavers), CEF

== Operational history ==
=== The Fenian Raids ===
The 10th or Royal Regiment of Toronto Volunteers was called out on active service from 8 to 31 March and from 1 to 22 June 1866. The battalion served on the Niagara frontier.

=== North West Rebellion ===
The 10th Battalion, Royal Grenadiers was called to arms on 27 March 1885 and turned out in marching order the following day. The Battalion served with Middleton's column of the North West Field Force, until they returned from active service on 24 July 1885. The 10th Royals saw action at the Battle of Fish Creek (24 April), and the Battle of Batoche (9-12 May).

=== South African War ===
The 10th Battalion Royal Grenadiers contributed volunteers for the 2nd (Special Service) Battalion, Royal Canadian Regiment of Infantry during the South African War.

=== The Great War ===
Details of the 10th Regiment Royal Grenadiers were placed on active service on 6 August 1914 for local protection duties.

The 3rd Battalion (Toronto Regiment), CEF was authorized on 10 August 1914 and embarked for Great Britain on 26 September 1914. It disembarked in France on 11 February 1915, where it fought as part of the 1st Infantry Brigade, 1st Canadian Division in France and Flanders until the end of the war. The battalion was disbanded on 15 September 1920.

The 58th Battalion, CEF, was authorized on 20 April 1915 and embarked for Great Britain on 22 November 1915. It disembarked in France on 22 February 1916, where it fought as part of the 9th Infantry Brigade, 3rd Canadian Division in France and Flanders until the end of the war. The battalion was disbanded on 15 September 1920. Its battalion history is captured in the book, "Second to None" by Kevin Shackleton.

The 123rd Battalion (Royal Grenadiers), CEF, was authorized on 22 December 1915 and embarked for Great Britain on 7 and 8 August 1916. It was converted to pioneers and redesignated the 123rd Canadian Pioneer Battalion, Royal Grenadiers, CEF on 17 January 1917. It disembarked in France on 10 March 1917, where it served as the Pioneer Battalion of the 3rd Canadian Division in France and Flanders until 25 May 1918, when it was reorganized to form three new Engineering Battalions; the 7th, 8th and 9th Canadian Engineer Battalions, CEF. The battalion was disbanded on 15 September 1920. Its battalion history is chronicled in the book, "One-Two-Three - The Story of the 123rd Battalion, Royal Grenadiers, CEF" by Dan Mowat.

The 124th Battalion (Governor General's Body Guard), CEF, was authorized on 22 December 1915 and embarked for Great Britain on 7 August 1916. It was redesignated the 124th Canadian Pioneer Battalion, CEF, on 17 January 1917. It disembarked in France on 11 March 1917, where it served as part of the 4th Canadian Division in France and Flanders until 26 May 1918, when it was reorganized to form three new Engineering Battalions; the 10th, 11th and 12th Canadian Engineer Battalions, CEF. The battalion was disbanded on 15 September 1920.

The 170th Battalion (Mississauga Horse), CEF, was authorized on 15 July 1916 and embarked for Great Britain on 25 October 1916. On 8 December 1916, its personnel were absorbed by the 169th Battalion (109th Regiment), CEF, to provide reinforcements for the Canadian Corps in the field. The battalion was disbanded on 17 July 1917.

The 204th Battalion (Beavers), CEF, was authorized on 15 July 1916 and embarked for Great Britain on 28 March 1917. On 4 May 1917, its personnel were absorbed by the 2nd Reserve Battalion, CEF, to provide reinforcements for the Canadian Corps in the field. The battalion was disbanded on 17 July 1917.

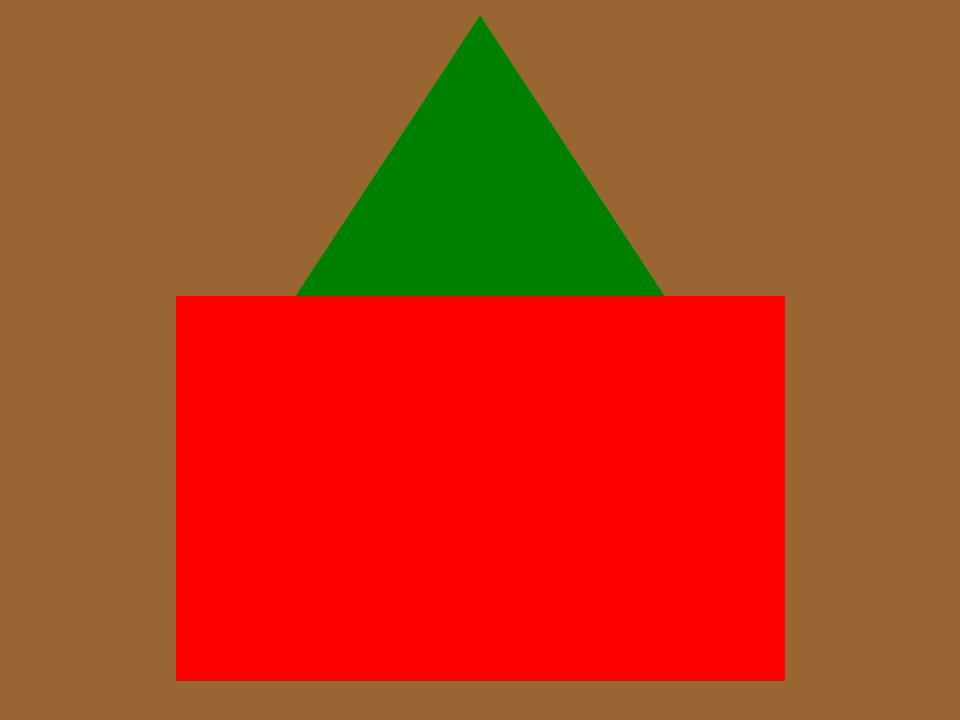
The distinguishing patch of the 3rd Battalion (Toronto Regiment), CEF.

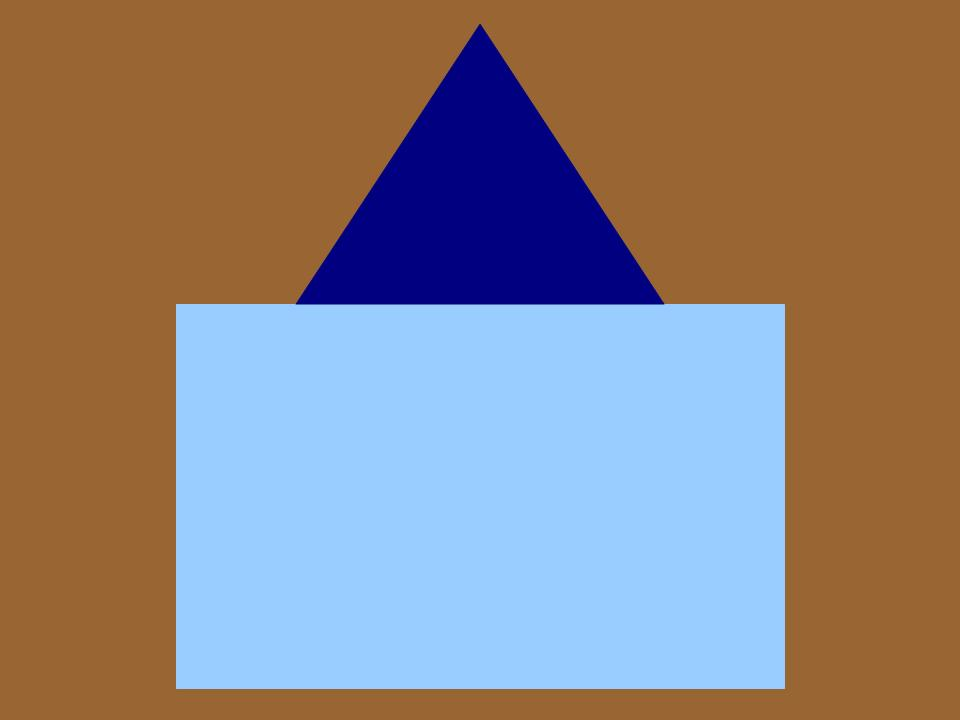
The distinguishing patch of the 58th Battalion, CEF.

=== Second World War ===
The regiment mobilised the Royal Regiment of Canada, CASF (Canadian Active Service Force), for active service on 1 September 1939. It embarked for garrison duty in Iceland with "Z" Force on 10 June 1940, and on 31 October 1940 it was transferred to Great Britain. It was redesignated the 1st Battalion, the Royal Regiment of Canada, CASF, on 7 November 1940 when a 2nd Battalion was formed to provide reinforcements to the Regiment in Europe. The 1st battalion took part in the raid on Dieppe on 19 August 1942. It landed again in France on 7 July 1944, as part of the 4th Infantry Brigade, 2nd Canadian Infantry Division, and continued to fight in North-West Europe until the end of the war. The 1st battalion was disbanded on 31 December 1945 when it amalgamated with the 2nd Battalion back home.

=== Raid on Dieppe - Blue Beach ===
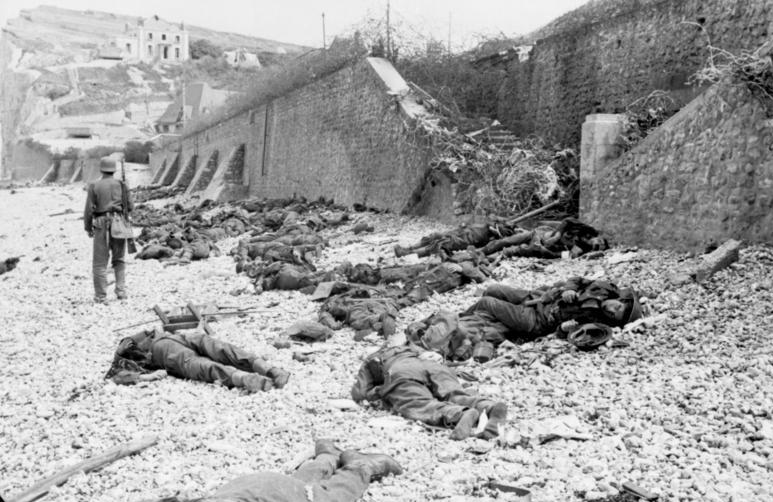
Royals dead on Blue Beach at Puys. The height of the seawall can be clearly seen, the machine gun position above the sentry's head is well placed to fire along the wall

The naval engagement between the small German convoy and the craft carrying No. 3 Commando had alerted the German defenders at Blue Beach. The Royal Regiment of Canada landed near Puys along with three platoons from the Black Watch (Royal Highland Regiment) of Canada and an artillery detachment who were tasked to neutralize machine gun and artillery batteries protecting the Dieppe beach. They were delayed by 20 minutes and the smoke screens that should have hidden their assault had lifted, eliminating the advantage of surprise and darkness. The Germans manned their defensive positions in preparation for the landings. The well-emplaced German forces stopped the Canadian forces that did land on the beach. As soon as they reached the shore, the Canadians found themselves pinned against the seawall, unable to advance and having murderous rifle and machine-gun fire rain down from the cliffs above. The Royals suffered severe casualties: of the 556 men in the regiment 200 were killed and 264 captured.

== Alliances ==
- United Kingdom – The Duke of Lancaster's Regiment (King's, Lancashire and Border)
- Australia – The Royal Victoria Regiment

== Battle honours ==
Regimental colour

In the list below, battle honours in small capitals are for large operations and campaigns and those in lowercase are for more specific battles. Bold type indicates honours emblazoned on regimental colours.

North West Rebellion
- **Fish Creek**
- **Batoche**
- **North West Canada, 1885**
South African War
- **South Africa, 1899–1900**
First World War
- **Ypres, 1915, '17**
- Gravenstafel
- **St. Julien**
- **Festubert, 1915**
- **Mount Sorrel**
- **Somme, 1916, '18**
- Pozières
- Flers–Courcelette
- Ancre Heights
- **Arras, 1917, '18**
- **Vimy, 1917**
- Arleux
- Scarpe, 1917, '18
- Hill 70
- **Passchendaele**
- **Amiens**
- Drocourt–Quéant
- **Hindenburg Line**
- Canal du Nord
- Cambrai, 1918
- Pursuit to Mons
- France and Flanders, 1915–'18
Second World War
- **Dieppe**
- Bourguébus Ridge
- **Faubourg de Vaucelles**
- **Verrières Ridge–Tilly-la-Campagne**
- **Falaise**
- Falaise Road
- Clair Tizon
- Forêt de la Londe
- Dunkirk, 1944
- **The Scheldt**
- Woensdrecht
- **South Beveland**
- **The Rhineland**
- Goch–Calcar Road
- **The Hochwald**
- **Xanten**
- **Twente Canal**
- Groningen
- Oldenburg
- North-West Europe, 1942, 1944–1945
South-West Asia
- Afghanistan

== Band ==
The Band of The Royal Regiment of Canada is the oldest permanently organized band in the Canadian Army and in the whole of the Canadian Armed Forces. Based at Fort York in Toronto, the band has served its country, province and city in many different roles throughout the world since its formation in 1863.

Some highlights from the band's itinerary are:

- Performances for the Queen Mother, Princess Anne, the Duke of York, Prince Charles and Queen Elizabeth II.
- International commitments include: performances for the United Nations in Cyprus; the Military Musical Pageant, held at Wembley Stadium, in London, England; a command performance for the colonel-in-chief, Charles, Prince of Wales, in the Gardens of Buckingham Palace; and, being selected as the official band to accompany the veterans and the official party to the United Kingdom and France to commemorate the 50th anniversary of the raid on Dieppe 19 August 1942. In summer 2006 the band performed at the 16th International Military Band Festival in Kraków, Poland. Recent years have seen the band travel from Gander, Newfoundland and Labrador, to Victoria, British Columbia, with many performances in between (including the launching of the ship the Hector in Pictou, Nova Scotia, The Summerside Tattoo in Prince Edward Island, and the 2000 International Military Festival of Music in Quebec City).

== Gallery ==
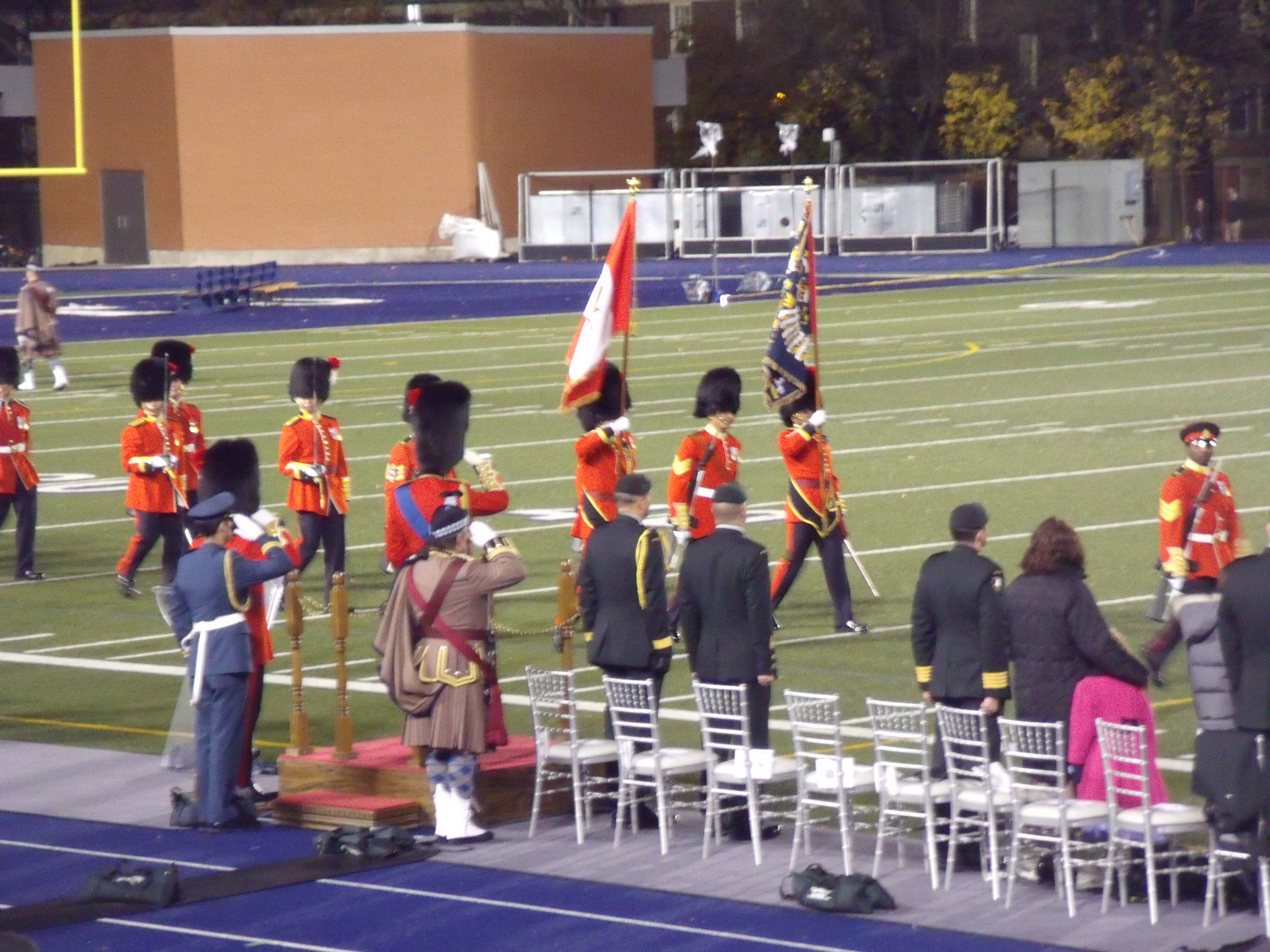
Presentation of Colours March Past

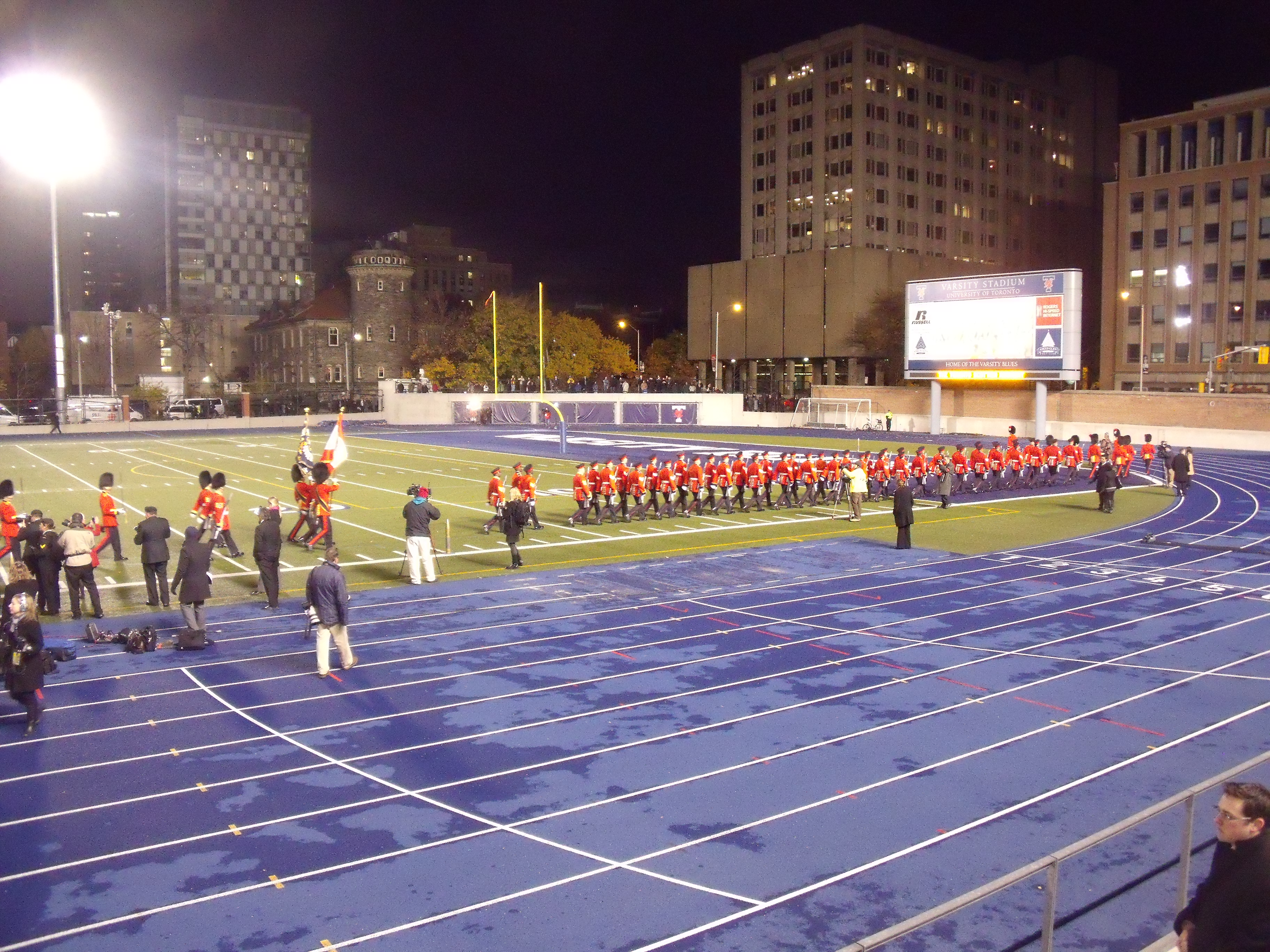
Presentation of Colours March Past

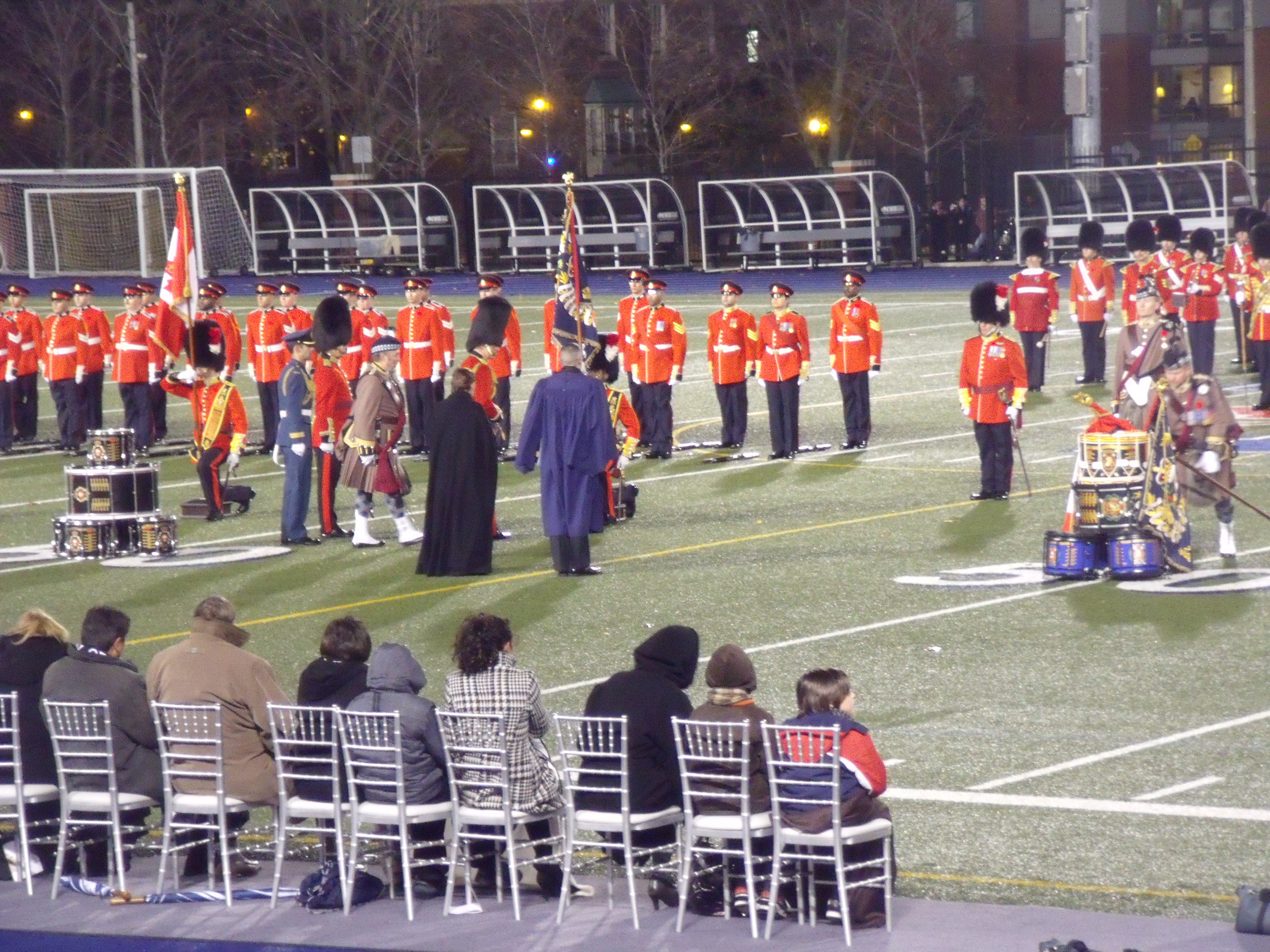
Charles, Prince of Wales, presents new colours to the Royal Regiment of Canada and Toronto Scottish Regiment at Varsity Stadium in Toronto, 5 November 2009.

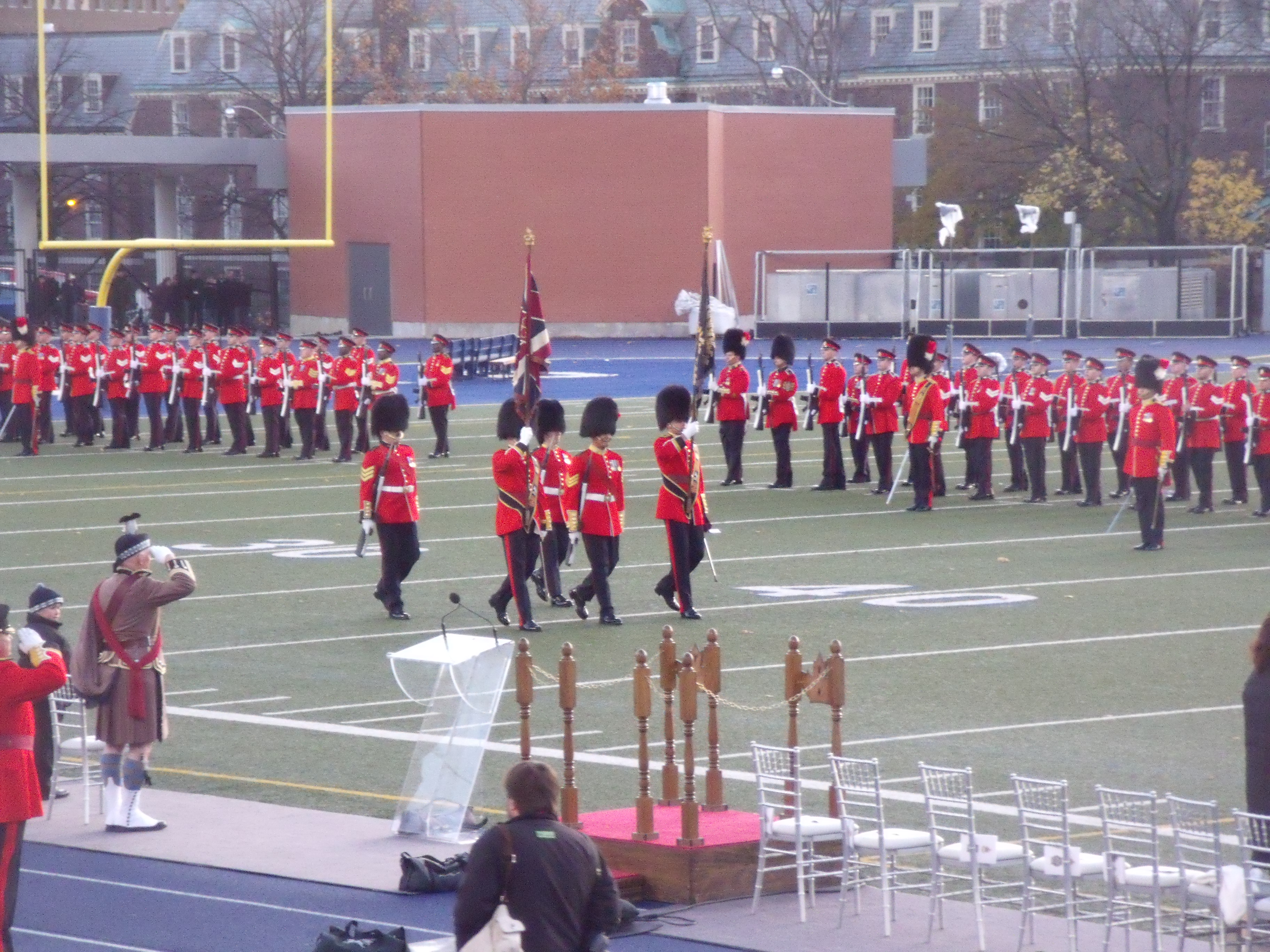
Presentation of Colours March Off

== The Royal Regiment of Canada Association ==
The Royal Regiment of Canada Association consists of former members of the unit. The Association meets the first Thursday of each month September to June in the Royal Regiment of Canada Warrant Officers and Sergeants Mess in Canadian Forces Armoury, Fort York. The main goal of the association is to maintain the comradeship and esprit du corps of the regimental family. The Association in 2008 co-ordinated a successful fund-raising campaign aimed at obtaining sufficient stocks of the scarlet and blue full dress of the regiment to enable the majority of its personnel to parade in this traditional uniform on ceremonial occasions.

== The Museum of The Royal Regiment of Canada ==
The Royal Regiment of Canada Museum
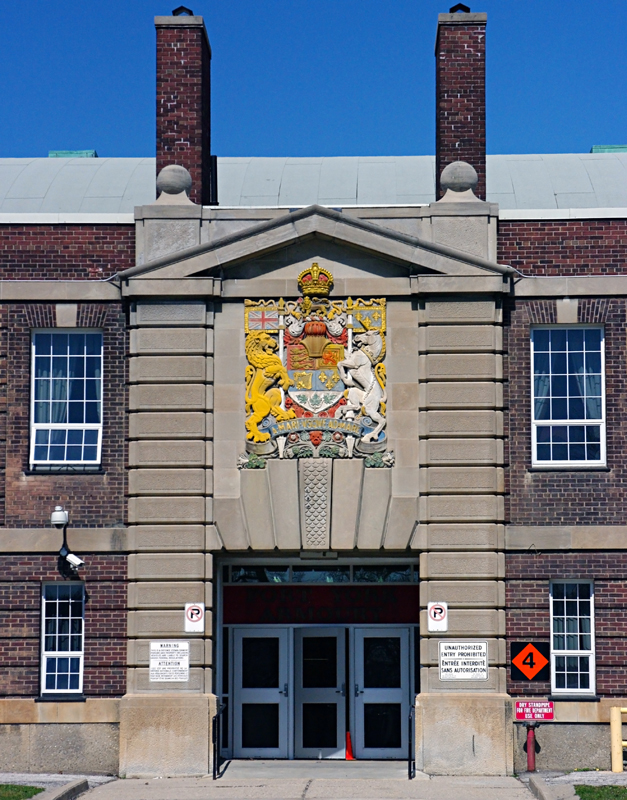
- Location: Fort York Armoury, 660 Fleet Street West, Toronto, Ontario, Canada
- Type: Regimental Museum

The museum preserves and displays the history of the Royal Regiment of Canada and its several predecessors for the benefit of both the members of the regiment and the public at large. The museum is affiliated with: CMA, CHIN, OMMC and Virtual Museum of Canada. The regiment's museum is at the Fort York Armoury. Exhibits include weapons, uniforms, medals, photographs and artifacts about the history of the Royal Regiment of Canada and its predecessors – the 10th Royal Grenadiers, 3rd Battalion (Toronto Regiment) and 123rd, 124th, 204th and 58th Battalions, Canadian Expeditionary Force. The museum offers displays and school tours by appointment.

== Fort York Armoury ==
Home of the Royal Regiment of Canada

- 660 Fleet Street West, Toronto, ON M5V 1A9

== Order of precedence ==
Preceded by Les Voltigeurs de Québec	Royal Regiment of Canada	Succeeded by The Royal Hamilton Light Infantry (Wentworth Regiment)

== See also ==
- The Canadian Crown and the Canadian Forces
- List of Canadian organizations with royal patronage
- List of armouries in Canada
- Military history of Canada
- History of the Canadian Army
- Canadian Forces

== Books ==
- Bennett, W R (1999). Historical vignettes of The Royal Regiment of Canada. Toronto: The Royal Regiment of Canada.
- Gilchrist, J Brian (1996). Sacred to the memory of—: the memorials at the Cathedral Church of St. James (Anglican), Toronto, Ontario : transcriptions of the plaques, tombstones, stained glass windows and other engraved memorials along with the Book of Remembrance for World War II of The Royal Regiment of Canada. Toronto: J. Gilchrist.
- Goodspeed, D J (1967). Battle royal: a history of The Royal Regiment of Canada, 1862-1962. Toronto, Montreal: McClelland and Stewart.
- Brief history of The Royal Regiment of Canada: allied with the King's Regiment (Liverpool). Toronto, Ont.: The Regiment. 1948.

=== Fiction ===
- Law, Richard M (2018). Flowers of the Forest - The Pride of Our Land. Tellwell Talent.—Historical/Fiction novel about the 58th Battalion, CEF in Ypres, Belgium.

The story of three young men from Aberdeen, Scotland, who joined the 58th Battalion, CEF, in 1915. Their ability to play football with a high degree of skill directs their journey into war

== CD ==
- The Royal Regiment of Canada Band "O Canada" Music CD audio (S.l.: Mastersound, ©1998)
