= Wentworth Regiment =

The Wentworth Regiment
- Active: 1872-1936
- Country: Canada
- Branch: Canadian Militia
- Type: Line Infantry
- Role: Infantry
- Size: One Regiment
- Part of: Non-Permanent Active Militia
- Garrison/HQ: Dundas, Ontario
- Engagements: First World War
- Battle honours: Arras, 1917; Hill 70; Ypres, 1917

The Wentworth Regiment was an infantry regiment of the Non-Permanent Active Militia of the Canadian Militia (now the Canadian Army). In 1936, the regiment was Amalgamated with The Royal Hamilton Light Infantry to form The Royal Hamilton Light Infantry (Wentworth Regiment).

== Lineage ==
=== The Wentworth Regiment ===
- Originated on 23 May 1872, in Dundas, Ontario, as the 77th Wentworth Battalion of Infantry.
- Redesignated on 8 May 1900, as the 77th Wentworth Regiment.
- Redesignated on 1 May 1920, as The Wentworth Regiment.
- Amalgamated on 15 December 1936, with The Royal Hamilton Light Infantry and Redesignated as The Royal Hamilton Light Infantry (Wentworth Regiment).

== Perpetuations ==
129th (Wentworth) Battalion, CEF

== History ==
=== Early history ===
On 23 May 1872, the 77th Wentworth Battalion of Infantry was authorized to be formed. Its Regimental Headquarters was at Dundas and had companies at Dundas, Waterdown, Binbrooke, Rockton, Saltfleet and Glanford, Ontario.

=== Great War ===
On 6 August 1914, Details from the 77th Wentworth Regiment were placed on active service for local protection duties.

On 22 December 1915, the 129th Battalion (Wentworth), CEF was authorised for service and on 24 August 1916, the battalion embarked for Great Britain. After its arrival in the UK, its personnel were absorbed by the 123rd Battalion (Royal Grenadiers), CEF and 124th Battalion (Governor General's Body Guard), CEF on 18 October 1916, to provide reinforcements to the Canadian Corps in the field. On 21 May 1917, the 129th Battalion, CEF was disbanded.

=== 1920s–1930s ===
Following the Otter Commission and the accompanying post-war reorganization of the Canadian Militia, on 1 May 1920, the 77th Wentworth Regiment was Redesignated as The Wentworth Regiment.

As a result of the 1936 Canadian Militia Reorganization, The Wentworth Regiment was Amalgamated with The Royal Hamilton Light Infantry to form The Royal Hamilton Light Infantry (Wentworth Regiment).

== Alliances ==
- The Middlesex Regiment (Duke of Cambridge's Own) (1911-1936)

== Battle honours ==
- Arras, 1917 (Note: Selected to be borne on colours and appointments)
- Hill 70
- Ypres, 1917
