= 170th Battalion (Mississauga Horse), CEF =

The 170th (Mississauga Horse) Battalion, CEF, was an infantry unit in the Canadian Expeditionary Force during the First World War. Based in Toronto, Ontario, the unit began recruiting during the winter of 1915/16 in that city. Many of the recruits came from the 9th Mississauga Horse militia regiment. After sailing to England in October 1916, the battalion was absorbed into the 169th Battalion, CEF, on December 8, 1916.

Lieutenant-Colonel Le Grand Reed was the only officer commanding of the 170th (Mississauga Horse) Battalion.

The battalion is perpetuated by The Royal Regiment of Canada.
