= 86th (Machine Gun) Battalion, CEF =

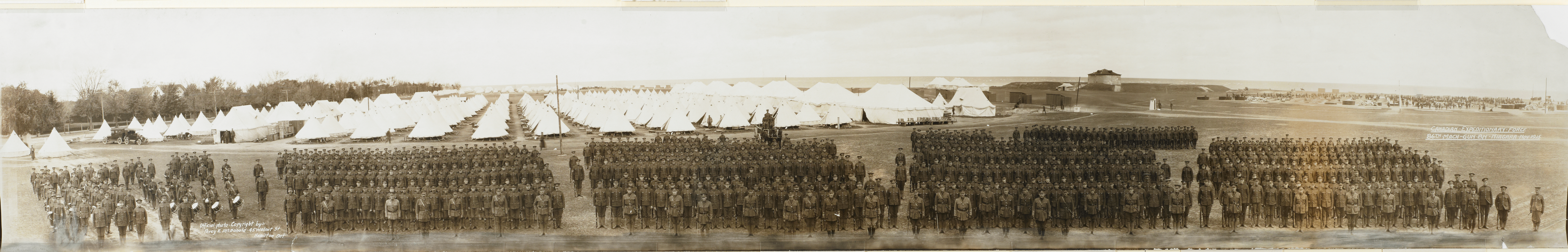
- The battalion in Niagara, Ontario, November 1915
- Active: 1915–1917
- Country: Canada
- Branch: Canadian Expeditionary Force
- Type: Infantry, machine gunners
- Role: Depot
- Size: 1,000 personnel
- Engagements: World War I

The 86th (Machine Gun) Battalion, CEF, was an infantry battalion of the Canadian Expeditionary Force, which was raised for overseas service during World War I. Authorized on December 22, 1915, the battalion embarked for Britain in May 1916. Based at Shorncliffe, the battalion was reorganized as the Canadian Machine Gun Depot, CEF, and provided reinforcements for Canadian units in the field until it was disbanded on 1 September 1917. It is believed to have been "the first of its kind in the British Empire."

== History ==
The 86th Battalion was authorized on December 22, 1915, and was recruited in Hamilton, Wentworth and Dundas, Ontario, and was mobilized at Hamilton. Recruits were drawn from several local depot regiments. These included the 13th Regiment, 91st Highlanders, 2nd Dragoons and the 1st Field Engineers. Men were also selected from the 77th Regiment in Dundas as well as the 44th Regiment in Welland. The battalion's fourth machine gun company (D Company) was formed from the latter of these.

The battalion departed for Camp Niagara on September 23, 1915, with a strength of about 1,000 men. They remained at Camp Niagara until early November, when they returned to Hamilton. They were subsequently stationed at the Old Armouries on James Street.

The 86th Machine Gun Battalion embarked for Britain on 19 May 1916. Upon reaching their destination, the battalion moved into Risborough Barracks, at Shorncliffe, for further training. On June 22, 1916, the 86th Machine Gun Battalion was redesignated the Canadian Machine Gun Depot. After training the men were transferred as reinforcements to various machine gun units that were serving on the Western Front. The unit's date of disbandment is unclear, with different dates being provided by several sources. Volume 3 of Insignia and Lineages of the Canadian Forces lists the unit's date of disbandment as September 1, 1917, although according to Ken Scheffler there is mention in the Hamilton Spectator of the depot existing in 1919.

The regimental colours were laid up in St. Giles Presbyterian Church in Hamilton on November 16, 1919. In 2013, when the church building became unused, the colours were moved to the Sergeants' Mess of the John Weir Foote VC Armoury.

== Perpetuation and battle honours ==
The 86th Battalion was awarded the battle honour "THE GREAT WAR, 1916".

The battalion is perpetuated by The Royal Hamilton Light Infantry (Wentworth Regiment).

== Photos ==
- Photo of the 86th Machine Gun Battalion
- Recruitment Poster Recruitment poster for 86th Machine Gun Battalion

== See also ==
- List of infantry battalions in the Canadian Expeditionary Force
