= Denis Whitaker =

Canadian athlete, soldier, businessman, and author (1915–2001)

William Denis Whitaker
- Born: February 27, 1915; Calgary, Alberta, Canada
- Died: May 30, 2001 (aged 86)
- Military career
- Allegiance: Canada
- Branch: Canadian Army
- Rank: Brigadier
- Commands: 1st Battalion, The Royal Hamilton Light Infantry (Wentworth Regiment)
- Awards: DSO and Bar, CM, ED, CD Commander of the Order of the Crown (Belgium) Order of Canada; Legion of Honor.
- Other work: Later businessman and author

Brigadier William Denis Whitaker, CM DSO & Bar ED CD (February 27, 1915 – May 30, 2001) was a Canadian athlete, soldier, businessman, and author.

== Early life ==
Born in Calgary, Alberta and raised in Toronto, Ontario, Whitaker was educated at the University of Toronto Schools and later at the Royal Military College of Canada. He was student #2357 in Kingston, Ontario. He graduated in 1933. He was a quarterback for the Hamilton Tigers of the Ontario Rugby Football Union.

He joined the Canadian Army and accepted a commission, as a second lieutenant with The Royal Hamilton Light Infantry (Wentworth Regiment) in 1937.

== Military career ==
During the Second World War, Whitaker was awarded the Distinguished Service Order at the rank of captain for his achievement in the Dieppe Raid in August 1942. He was the only one of the 100 officers who landed on the beach to fight his way into town and escape unwounded. As a lieutenant colonel, Whitaker commanded the 1st Battalion, The Royal Hamilton Light Infantry–Canadian Army Active from February 17, 1944, until July 17, 1944, and from September 15, 1944, until March 29, 1945, throughout most of the fighting in northwest Europe. On October 16, 1944, during the Battle of the Scheldt, Whitaker took the village of Woensdrecht, which presented particular problems for the Canadians in their advance along the banks of the river Scheldt. He won a second Distinguished Service Order in February 1945 for leadership in the Battle of Goch-Calcar Road during Operation Veritable.

At the end of the war, he was promoted to the rank of brigadier. Whitaker left the army in 1951, but returned as Honorary Colonel of the Royal Hamilton Light Infantry from 1972 to 1992.

== Business career ==
After his military service, he was a commercial manager of radio station CHML. In 1962, he was named vice-president of O'Keefe Brewing Co. and soon became the president. He was also the president of Major Market Advertising and a financial consultant with Nesbitt Burns.

== Sports career ==
Denis "Dinny" Whitaker
Profile
- Position: Quarterback

Career information
- College: University of Toronto Schools & Royal Military College of Canada

Career history
- 1937–39: Hamilton Tigers
- 1945–46: Hamilton Tigers

Whitaker's sports career was equally illustrious, beginning with captaincy of the Royal Military College of Canada ice hockey and Canadian football teams. He led the Hamilton Tigers in 1938. He was named to the Canadian Forces Sports Honour Roll and was a national senior squash sport champion. He chaired the Canadian Equestrian Team for 20 years, and under his guidance the team won two Olympics, 15 Pan-American Games and two World Championship gold medals. He was also chef-de-mission for the 1980 Canadian Olympic Team in Moscow, which the Canadians eventually boycotted, along with the Americans due to the Soviets invading Afghanistan. He was a founder and member of the Olympic Trust of Canada. In 1990, he was inducted into Canada's Sports Hall of Fame. Denis was one of the founding members of the Hamilton Hunt Club, started in 1958 in Caledonia, Ontario. He was a Master of Foxhounds and rode with the club from 1958 to 1973.

== Decorations and honours ==
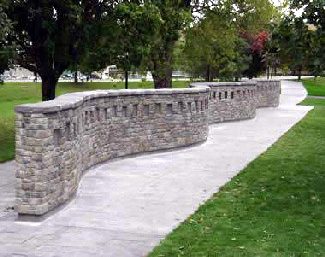
Wall of Honour, Royal Military College of Canada

- Distinguished Service Order with Bar
- Efficiency Decoration (E.D.)
- Commander of the Order of the Crown (Belgium)
- In 1989, he was named a Member of the Order of Canada.
- In April 1995, the French government awarded Whitaker the Order of the Legion of Honour for his role in the liberation of France.

== Selected works ==
- Normandy: The Real Story of How Ordinary Allied Soldiers Defeated Hitler by Denis Whitaker, Shelagh Whitaker, and Terry Copp
- Victory at Falaise: The Soldier's Story by Denis Whitaker and Shelagh Whitaker with Terry Copp
- Tug of War: The Allied Victory That Opened Antwerp by Denis Whitaker and Shelagh Whitaker
- Dieppe: Tragedy to Triumph by Denis Whitaker and Shelagh Whitaker
- Rhineland: The Battle to End the War by Denis Whitaker and Shelagh Whitaker, 1989
  - in German: Endkampf am Rhein. Transl. Ute Spengler. Ullstein, Berlin 1991
- The Battle of the Scheldt by Denis Whitaker
