= 205th (Tiger) Battalion, CEF =

Military unit

The 205th (Tiger) Battalion, CEF was a unit in the Canadian Expeditionary Force during the First World War. Established in late 1915, it was stationed in Hamilton, Ontario and began recruiting toward the end of February 1916. In late 1916, the unit was redesignated a machine gun battalion, but a few months later, in April 1917, the 205th (Tiger) Battalion was broken up for drafts. One company (250 men) was transferred to the 164th (Halton and Dufferin) Battalion, CEF, which was recruiting in nearby Halton County. The unit continued to exist as the 205th Machine Gun Depot and then the 205th Machine Gun School.

The 205th (Tiger) Battalion, CEF, also referred to as the Sportsmen's Battalion, was named in honour of the Hamilton Tigers athletic club, one of the oldest athletic clubs in the city at that time. Many of the early recruits were local athletes, the most notable being the Olympic medalist Robert Kerr.

The 205th Battalion is perpetuated by The Royal Hamilton Light Infantry (Wentworth Regiment).

One member of the battalion was George Malcolm (Snooze) Ireland who was a member of the 1915 Grey Cup team. When World War I ended Ireland was the captain of the Hamilton Tigers 1919 Team. During the war, no Grey Cup games were played including 1919.
