= Robert Dodds (aviator) =

Robert E. Dodds
- Born: March 11, 1893; Stoney Creek, Ontario, Canada
- Died: October 8, 1980 (aged 87); Hamilton, Ontario, Canada
- Burial place: Hamilton Cemetery, section R
- Military career
- Allegiance: Canada; United Kingdom
- Branch: Canadian Expeditionary Force; Royal Flying Corps
- Rank: Captain
- Nickname: "Bob"
- Unit: No. 48 Squadron RFC/No. 48 Squadron RAF
- Conflicts: World War I World War II
- Awards: Military Cross, OBE
- Other work: Headed civil aviation division of Canadian Defense Department for 25 years

Captain Robert E. Dodds MC OBE (11 March 1893–8 October 1980) was a Canadian World War I flying ace credited with 11 aerial victories. Postwar, he would remain involved in civil aviation. By 1957, he had risen to become the Director of Civil Aviation for Canada.

== Early life and infantry service ==
Robert Dodds was born in Stoney Creek, Canada on 11 March 1893, to Margaret Dodds. He enrolled in the 129th Battalion of the Canadian Expeditionary Force on 3 January 1916 at Dundas, Canada. On his enlistment papers, he gave his occupation as fruit grower, stated he was single and lived on Rural Route 5 with his mother. Though he claimed no prior military experience, he belonged to the 77th Regiment of militia. He signed his enrollment form "R. Dodds, Lieut".

== World War I ==
On 27 March 1917, Dodds was appointed a Flying Officer.

Dodds was posted to 48 Squadron as a Bristol F.2 Fighter pilot on 12 July 1917. Nine days later, Dodds shared in a victory with fellow aces Brian Edmund Baker and Robert Coath. Dodds scored his fifth victory on 21 October 1917 and closed out the year as an ace. A double victory on 9 January 1918, followed by three wins on 8 March, brought his total to ten.

On 10 February 1918, after his sixth and seventh wins, Lieutenant Dodds was appointed Flight Commander and temporary captain.

His valor was not confined to air-to-air combat; on 19 March 1918, he led a bombing attack through heavy ground fire to bomb a German hangar from low level. He then circled the German airfield in his riddled plane as his squadron also bombed the enemy.

Both of these feats were cited when Military Cross (MC) was published in The London Gazette:

Lieutenant (Temporary/Captain) Robert Dodds, 1st Central Ontario Regiment and Royal Flying Corps

...He has destroyed or driven down eleven enemy machines. On one occasion while on a one-machine patrol he attacked three enemy scouts, but owing to his gun jamming he was forced to withdraw from the attack. Though under heavy fire from the pursuing enemy he succeeded in remedying the defect, and then turned and attacked the enemy again. He destroyed one of them and drove down another out of control. Later, he led a bombing raid on an enemy aerodrome, and under intense machine gun fire from the ground dived to within 100 feet of the hangars before releasing his bombs. Though his machine was damaged, he remained at a height of 200 feet until the rest of his formation had dropped their bombs. His magnificent example of pluck and determination was of the greatest value to the squadron.

== List of victories ==
No.	Date/time	Aircraft	Foe	Result	Location	Notes
1	21 July 1917 @ 1800 hours	Bristol F.2 Fighter serial number A7153	Albatros D.III	Driven down out of control	Slijpe, Belgium	Dodd's ace observer was Lieutenant Thomas Tuffield
2	22 August 1917 @ 0905 hours	Bristol F.2 Fighter s/n 7222	Albatros D.III	Driven down out of control	Ghistelles, Belgium	Observer Tuffield
3	3 September 1917 @ 0815 hours	Bristol F.2 Fighter s/n 7222	Albatros D.III	Destroyed by fire	North of Dixmude, Belgium	Observer Tuffield. Otto Hartmann KIA
4	3 September 1917 @ 0815 hours	Bristol F.2 Fighter s/n 7222	Albatros D.III	Driven down out of control	North of Dixmude	Observer Tuffield
5	21 October 1917 @ 1245 hours	Bristol F.2 Fighter s/n B1134	Albatros D.V	Driven down out of control	Clemskerke	Observer ace Lieutenant Arthur Cyril Cooper
6	9 January 1918 @ 1140 hours	Bristol F.2 Fighter s/n B1182	Rumpler reconnaissance plane	Driven down out of control	Caudry, France	Observer Lieutenant W. Hart
7	9 January 1918 @ 1150 hours	Bristol F.2 Fighter s/n B1182	Albatros D.V	Driven down out of control	Willencourt, France	Observer Lieutenant W. Hart
8	morning of 8 March 1918	Bristol F.2 Fighter s/n C4606	Pfalz D.III	Destroyed by fire	La Fère, France	Observer Lieutenant D. Wishart-Orr
9	morning of 8 March 1918	Bristol F.2 Fighter s/n C4606	Pfalz D.III	Destroyed by fire	La Fère	Observer Lieutenant D. Wishart-Orr
10	8 March 1918 @ 1600 hours	Bristol F.2 Fighter s/n C4606	Reconnaissance two-seater	Driven down out of control	Bellecourt-Quesnoy	Observer Lieutenant D. Wishart-Orr

== Post World War I ==
On 4 May 1919, Dodds was seconded from 1st Central Ontario Regiment to the Royal Air Force as an acting captain; simultaneously, he relinquished his RAF commission and went on the unemployed list.

Dodds then returned to Canada and helped found the Hamilton Ontario Aero Club. He managed International Airways and supervised airmail operations in eastern Canada.

Dodds joined the Canadian Civil Aeronautics Division in 1930; he would become heavily involved in development of Canada's airways system, especially as it affected Trans-Canada Air Lines.

There was a Trans-Canada Airlines landing crash of a Lockheed Electra 14 (Registration CF-TCP) at Armstrong, Thunder Bay District, Ontario on 6 February 1941, killing 12; Chief Airline Inspector Dodds as chairman of the Federal Board of Inquiry arranged for removal of the crash debris to Winnipeg to aid in the accident investigation. This crash investigation was in addition to his ongoing administrative duties during World War II, providing airfields for use under the Empire Air Training Plan. He won the Order of the British Empire for this World War II service.

In 1950, he was promoted to Controller of Civil Aviation, putting him effectively in charge of Canada's civil aviation infrastructure.

On 11 August 1957, a DC-4 crash found Dodds as Director of the Civil Aviation Branch of Canada's Department of Transport.

He retired in 1958. He died on 8 October 1980.
