= Royal Hamilton Light Infantry Band =

Canadian military band

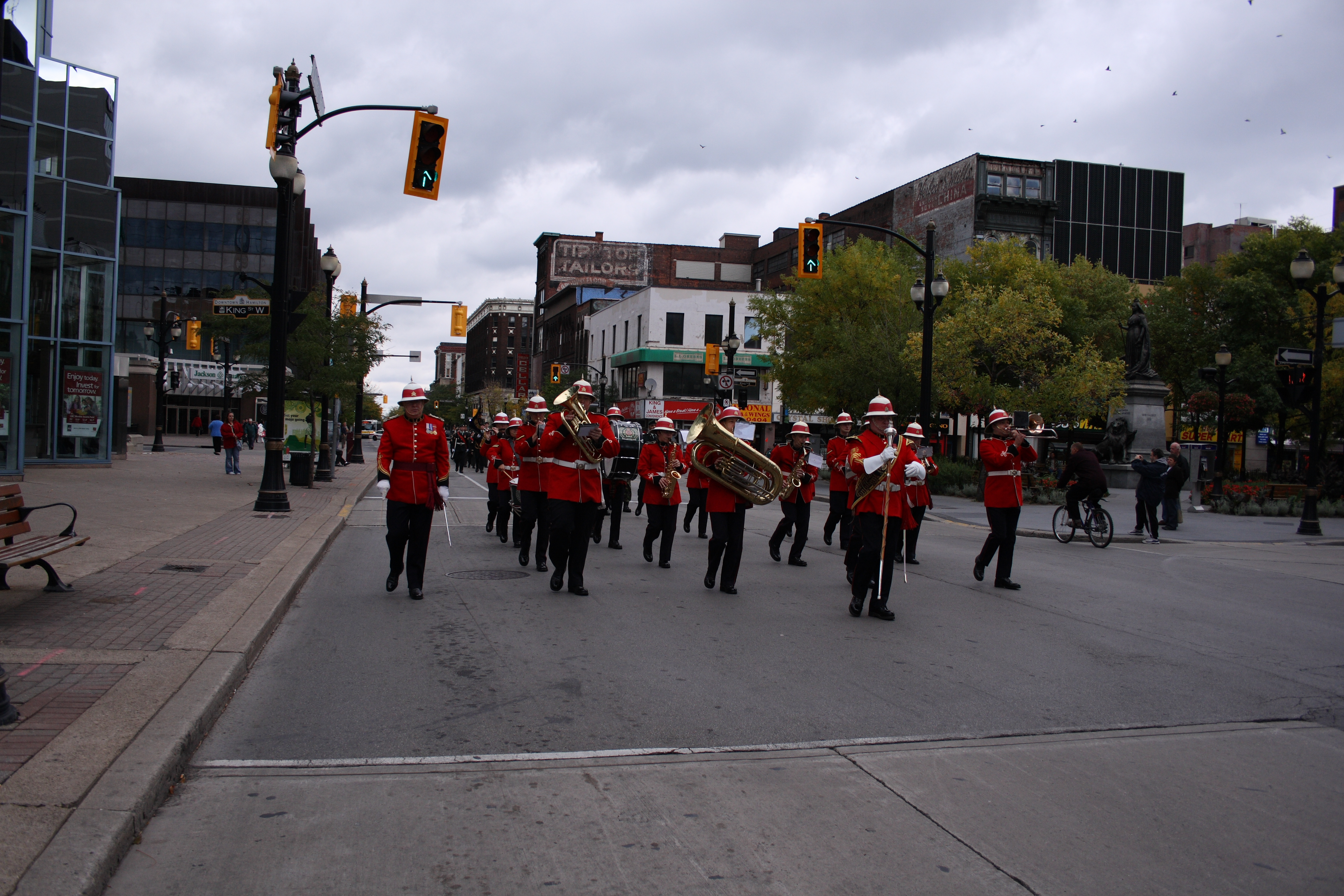
- The band marching from their barracks to the regimental church service.
- Active: February 14, 1866 – Present
- Country: Canada
- Branch: Canadian Army
- Type: Military band
- Size: 40 members
- Part of: Royal Hamilton Light Infantry
- Headquarters: Hamilton, Ontario
- Anniversaries: June 4

Commanders
- Director of Music: Captain Ryan Baker
- Notable commanders: George R. Robinson (1871–1916); Major Michael A. Rehill (1992–2016)

The Royal Hamilton Light Infantry Band is the regimental band of the Royal Hamilton Light Infantry. The Royal Hamilton Light Infantry Band is the oldest enlisted band in Canada. (Note: The Band of The Royal Regiment of Canada is the Canadian Force's oldest permanently organised band.) Abbreviated to the RHLI Band, it has played an extensive role in the musical culture and history of Hamilton, Ontario.

== History ==
It was created in 1866 by Peter Grossman, a German-born musician and instrumentalist, who created what was then known as the 13th Battalion Band, at the request of the commander of the 13th Battalion Voluntary Militia. Grossman, who had been the bandmaster of the Hamilton Artillery Band (founded in 1856), led the 13th Battalion Band until 1869. He was eventually succeeded in the long term by George R. Robinson, who was a graduate of the RSMS (Kneller Hall), London. He is best known for keeping the entire band in line with the latest developments in American military bands, adding clarinets, saxophones, french horns, flutes, oboes, and bassoons to the ensemble by the end of his tenure. During its first 10 years in existence the-40-piece band successfully toured areas throughout Eastern Canada and the Northeastern United States. In 1900 the band was invited to give a concert for the Maple Leaf Club of Denver, Colorado. In 1901, the band was chosen to play at a state dinner in Toronto honouring of the Duke and Duchess of Cornwall (later King George V and Mary of Teck).

For many years, the band gave weekly public concerts in the regimental drill shed, while during the summer it often filled as many as five or six engagements a week. At the time of Robinson's retirement in 1917, his son William succeeded his father and served as bandmaster until 1924. (Note: All of Robinson's three sons were band members.) He was succeeded by David Anderson, who served for 10 years before returning to lead the band for the rest of the 1930s. The band was disbanded in 1957, and the reconstituted in 1962 for the regimental centennial, supporting the RHLI for 10 years before it was disbanded again in 1972 and once again revived in 1992 under the direction of Major Michael A. Rehill.

== List of directors of music ==
Director of music	Term start	Term end
Peter Grossman	1866	1869
George R. Robinson	1869	1870
W. Blanchard	1870	1871
George R. Robinson	1871	1916
William F. Robinson	1916	1924 (Note: William was one of the three sons of George R. Robinson)
David Anderson	1924	1935
William F. Robinson	1935	1939
T.W. Sharman	1939	1942
H. J. Holder	1942	1950
H. G. Patterson	1950	1957
L. Sharman	1961	1966
A.T. Dharmaratnam	1966	1968
Major Michael A. Rehill	1992	2016
Capt Ryan Baker	2016	Incumbent

== Ensembles ==
The RHLI Band is composed of the following ensembles:

- RHLI Marching Band – It is the only ensemble of the band that is taken out to parade on the streets of Hamilton. It is the most notable part of the RHLI Band, also performing in military tattoos and ceremonial occasions. It performs in the traditional scarlet uniform of the RHLI and the regimental Pith helmet.
- RHLI Concert Band – Performs in symphonic settings. It usually performs any type of music.
- RHLI Brass Quintet – It is five-piece musical group which consists of two trumpets, a horn, a trombone, and a tuba. Their musical repertoire main consists of all types of music.
- RHLI Dance Band – It performs at many formal dinner events throughout the City of Hamilton. Also referred to as the big band, its repertoire is much more diverse than the other 3 ensembles. It plays a variety of genres including smooth jazz, polka, and rock. (Note: The Dance Band is also referred to as a big band or a jazz band.)

== Present day activities ==
The RHLI Band musical schedule includes several activities:

- Military Parades
- Regimental Dinners
- Concerts
- Regimental Holidays
- State Dinners
- Presentation of Colours
- Graduation Parades

Since 1992, the band has also performed at numerous military tattoos, festivals and celebrations. The following is a list of the numerous notable performances the band has given in its existence:

- 1871 Peace Jubilee in Berlin
- 1921 Canadian National Exhibition (the band won first place
- 1939 royal tour of Canada
- 84th Grey Cup
- 1998 royal visit
- 2002 royal visit
- 60th Anniversary of the Dieppe Raid in France
- 2016 Sounding Retreat in London

== See also ==
- Royal Hamilton Light Infantry
- Canadian military bands
- Military band
