= 120th (City of Hamilton) Battalion, CEF =

Canadian military unit (1915–1917)

The 120th (City of Hamilton) Battalion, CEF was a unit in the Canadian Expeditionary Force during the First World War. Based in Hamilton, Ontario, the unit began recruiting in late 1915 in that city and parts of Wentworth County. After sailing to England in August 1916, the battalion was absorbed into the 2nd Reserve Battalion (Central Ontario), CEF on January 20, 1917. The 120th (City of Hamilton) Battalion, CEF had one Officer Commanding: Lieut-Col. George Douglas Fearman.

The 120th Battalion is perpetuated by The Royal Hamilton Light Infantry (Wentworth Regiment).
