= 123rd Battalion (Royal Grenadiers), CEF =

The 123rd Battalion, Royal Grenadiers, CEF was a unit in the Canadian Expeditionary Force during the First World War. Based in Toronto, Ontario, they began recruiting in November 1915. After arriving in England, they continued to train as an infantry battalion for several months, but just before mobilizing to France in January 1917, the battalion was redesignated the 123rd Pioneer Battalion, Royal Grenadiers, CEF.

== History ==
The official authorization to raise the 123rd Overseas Battalion, Royal Grenadiers, CEF, was Militia General Order 151, dated December 6, 1915. However, orders had previously been issued by Militia District No. 2 on November 12, and by the time the official order was published, the recruitment for the battalion was virtually complete, although some members had signed up for service as early as September 1915. They were based in Toronto, Ontario. The battalion recruited, trained and mobilized as an infantry battalion in the Canadian Expeditionary Force (CEF) during the First World War. Many senior members of the 123rd Battalion had served with the 10th Royal Grenadiers prior to attesting in the 123rd Battalion. Of the total 1,100 soldiers on strength on December 28, 1915, only 110 had come from the Central Recruiting Depot; all others had come from the direct recruitment efforts of the battalion itself. They had trained at home as infantry soldiers. The 10th Royal Grenadiers also contributed approximately 30% of the soldiers who attested in the 3rd Battalion (Toronto Regiment), CEF starting in September 1914.

The battalion was separated into two groups in Halifax for mobilization to England, the first group sailing on the SS Cameronia under the command of Major Charles Armel Boone and the second group sailing on the SS Metagama, which departed Halifax harbour August 9, 1916, arriving in England August 17 and 18, 1916, respectively. Among other battalions in the convoy was the 124th Battalion (Governor General's Body Guard), CEF, which was also redesignated as a pioneer battalion.

On January 17, 1917, five months after arrival in England, the battalion was repurposed as a pioneer battalion and redesignated as the 123rd Pioneer Battalion, Royal Grenadiers, CEF, but continued to report through the 3rd Canadian Division commanded by Major General Louis James Lipsett. While most of the other Canadian Pioneer Battalions reported through the Canadian Engineers, the 123rd (and 124th) continued to report through the infantry organization. They commenced training as pioneers, under the guidance of a major of the British Pioneers. Many of the original members were fully trained as infantry soldiers and later as pioneers.

The 123rd Battalion was commanded by Lieutenant-Colonel Walter Bernard Kingsmill, who was the Commanding Officer of the 10th Royal Grenadiers at the time the 123rd Battalion was authorized on November 12, 1915, until May 25, 1918, when the battalion reorganized as the 3rd Canadian Engineer Brigade, comprising the 7th and 8th and 9th Canadian Engineer Battalions. Second in Command of the 123rd Battalion was Major Charles Armel Boone who had previously served in the British Armed Forces in Africa where he attained the rank of Major. Major Charles Armel Boone attended Upper Canada College in Toronto, RMC in Kingston and was an engineering graduate from the University of Toronto. Throughout 1917 and into mid-1918, the 123rd Battalion absorbed large contingents of reinforcements, primarily from the 180th Battalion, 129th Battalion, 3rd Canadian Pioneer Battalion and 3rd Reserve Battalion, and others.

In many cases the 123rd Battalion served with front line troops, and in fact, in front of the front line troops, to install barbed wire, improve roads, and establish battlements, fortification and dugouts for the front-line infantry troops to use and occupy. They suffered many casualties. Among their principal roles was to install bridge works and build plank roads to facilitate movement of troops, artillery pieces, and supply columns; only to have the Germans shell the roads, requiring immense efforts to get Canadians to and from the front. Many soldiers were wounded or died while serving with the 123rd Battalion, and many officers and men were decorated for their courageous acts.

The 123rd Overseas Battalion, Royal Grenadiers, was demobilized and disbanded on September 15, 1920, at the same time the CEF was disbanded.

== Perpetuations ==
The 123rd Battalion, CEF was first perpetuated by The Royal Grenadiers. In 1936 that regiment was amalgamated with The Toronto Regiment, the perpetuation is now continued by The Royal Regiment of Canada.

== Battle honours ==
The 123rd Battalion was awarded the following battle honours:

- Arras, 1917, '18+
- Vimy, 1917, 9–14 April 1917+
- Arleux
- Scarpe, 1917,3–4 May 1917
- Hill 70, 15–25 August 1917+
- Ypres 1917, 31 July – 10 November 1917
- Passchendaele, 12 October 1917 or 26 October – 10 November 1917+
- France and Flanders, 1917–18
