= 169th Battalion (109th Regiment), CEF =

The 169th Battalion, CEF was a unit in the Canadian Expeditionary Force during the First World War. Based in Toronto, Ontario, the unit began recruiting during the winter of 1915/16 in that city. After sailing to England in October 1916, the battalion was absorbed into the 5th Reserve Battalion on January 24, 1917.

The 169th Battalion, CEF had one Officer Commanding: Lieut-Col. J. C. Wright.
