= 124th Battalion (Governor General's Body Guard), CEF =

The 124th (Governor General's Body Guard) Battalion, CEF was a unit in the Canadian Expeditionary Force during the First World War. Based in Toronto, Ontario, the unit began recruiting in late 1915 in that city. After sailing to England in August 1916, the battalion was redesignated the 124th Pioneer Battalion, CEF. The battalion was later broken up to reinforce other engineering units.

The battalion is perpetuated by The Royal Regiment of Canada.
