= Haldimand =

Haldimand may refer to:

== People ==
For the surname Haldimand see Haldeman.

- Frederick Haldimand (1718–1791), Swiss-born army officer and governor of Quebec
- Peter Frederick Haldimand (1741 or 1742–1765), Swiss-born British army officer and surveyor
- William Haldimand (1784–1862), director of Bank of England
- Haldimand S. Putnam (1835–1863), American Union Army colonel
- Sydney Smith Haldimand Dickens (1847–1872), Royal Navy officer

== Places ==
- Alnwick/Haldimand, a township in Ontario
- Haldimand County, a county with city status in Ontario
- United Counties of Lincoln, Welland and Haldimand, Ontario, a historical county

== Electoral districts ==
- Brant—Haldimand, former federal electoral district in Ontario
- Haldimand (federal electoral district), federal district in Ontario
- Haldimand (Province of Canada electoral district)
- Haldimand (provincial electoral district)
- Haldimand and Monck, former federal district in Ontario
- Haldimand—Norfolk, federal electoral district in Ontario
- Haldimand—Norfolk (provincial electoral district)
- Haldimand—Norfolk—Brant, former federal electoral district
- Norfolk—Haldimand, former federal electoral district

== Buildings ==
- Château Haldimand, former building in Quebec City
- Haldimand County Museum & Archives
- Haldimand House, in Caledonia, Ontario

== Military ==
- 114th Battalion (Haldimand), CEF
- The Dufferin and Haldimand Rifles of Canada
- The Haldimand Rifles
