= Dufferin and Haldimand Rifles of Canada =

The Dufferin and Haldimand Rifles of Canada
- Active: 1866-1946
- Country: Canada
- Branch: Canadian Militia (1866-1940); Canadian Army (1940-1946)
- Type: Rifle Infantry
- Part of: Non-Permanent Active Militia (1866-1940); Royal Canadian Infantry Corps (1942-1946)
- Garrison/HQ: Brantford, Ontario
- Motto(s): Pervias rectas
- Engagements: Fenian Raids; First World War; Second World War
- Battle honours: See #Battle Honours

The Dufferin and Haldimand Rifles of Canada was an infantry regiment of the Non-Permanent Active Militia of the Canadian Militia and later the Canadian Army. The regiment was formed in 1936, when The Haldimand Rifles was Amalgamated with The Dufferin Rifles of Canada. In 1946, the regiment was converted from Infantry to Artillery and now forms part of the 56th Field Artillery Regiment, RCA.

== Lineage ==
=== The Dufferin and Haldimand Rifles of Canada ===
- Originated on 28 September 1866, in York, Ontario, as the 37th Haldimand Battalion of Rifles.
- Redesignated on 8 May 1900, as the 37th Regiment Haldimand Rifles.
- Redesignated on 1 May 1920, as The Haldimand Rifles.
- Amalgamated on 15 December 1936, with The Dufferin Rifles of Canada and C Company of the 3rd Machine Gun Battalion, CMGC (now The Argyll and Sutherland Highlanders of Canada (Princess Louise's)), and Redesignated as The Dufferin and Haldimand Rifles of Canada.
- Redesignated on 7 November 1940, as the 2nd (Reserve) Battalion, The Dufferin and Haldimand Rifles of Canada.
- Redesignated on 1 June 1945, as The Dufferin and Haldimand Rifles of Canada.
- Converted to Artillery on 1 April 1946, and Redesignated as the 56th Light Anti-Aircraft Regiment (Dufferin and Haldimand Rifles), RCA (now the 56th Field Artillery Regiment, RCA).

=== The Dufferin Rifles of Canada ===
- Originated on 28 September 1866, in Brantford, Ontario, as the 38th Brant Battalion of Infantry.
- Redesignated on 30 November 1866, as the 38th Brant Battalion of Infantry.
- Redesignated on 24 March 1871, as the 38th Brant Battalion of Rifles.
- Redesignated on 3 July 1874, as the 38th Brant Battalion or Dufferin Rifles.
- Redesignated on 28 September 1883, as the 38th Battalion Dufferin Rifles of Canada.
- Redesignated on 8 May 1900, as the 38th Regiment Dufferin Rifles of Canada.
- Redesignated on 1 May 1920, as The Dufferin Rifles of Canada.
- Amalgamated on 15 December 1936, with The Haldimand Rifles and C Company of the 3rd Machine Gun Battalion, CMGC, and Redesignated as The Dufferin and Haldimand Rifles of Canada.

== Perpetuations ==
- 4th Battalion (Central Ontario), CEF
- 36th Battalion, CEF
- 114th Battalion (Haldimand), CEF
- 125th Battalion (1st Overseas Battalion of 38th Regiment Dufferin Rifles), CEF
- 215th Battalion (2nd Overseas Battalion of 38th Regiment Dufferin Rifles), CEF

== History ==
=== 1936-1939 ===
As a direct result of the 1936 Canadian Militia Reorganization, The Dufferin and Haldimand Rifles of Canada was formed by the Amalgamation of The Haldimand Rifles, The Dufferin Rifles of Canada, and "C" Company of the 3rd Machine Gun Battalion, CMGC.

=== The Second World War ===
On 24 May 1940, the regiment mobilized The Dufferin and Haldimand Rifles of Canada, CASF for active service. On 7 November 1941, the battalion was redesignated as the 1st Battalion, The Dufferin and Haldimand Rifles of Canada, CASF. The battalion served in Canada in a home defence role as part of the 17th Canadian Infantry Brigade, 7th Canadian Infantry Division. On 8 March 1945, the battalion was disbanded.

== Organization ==
=== The Dufferin and Haldimand Rifles of Canada (15 December 1936) ===
- Regimental Headquarters (Brantford, Ontario)
- HQ Company (Dunnville, ON)
- A Company (Brantford, ON)
- B Company (Brantford, ON)
- C Company (Paris, ON)
- D Company (Hagersville, ON)

== Alliances ==
- The King's Royal Rifle Corps (1936-1946)

== Battle Honours ==
- Ypres 1915, ‘17
- Gravenstafel
- St. Julien
- Festubert, 1915
- Mount Sorrel
- Somme, 1916
- Pozieres
- Flers-Courcelette
- Ancre Heights
- Arras 1917, '18
- Vimy, 1917
- Arleux
- Scarpe, 1917, 18
- Hill 70
- Passchendaele
- Amiens
- Drocourt-Quéant
- Hindenburg Line
- Canal du Nord
- Pursuit to Mons
- France and Flanders, 1915-18

== Notable Members ==
- William Merrifield VC MM
- Oliver Milton Martin
