= Dufferin Rifles of Canada =

The Dufferin Rifles of Canada
- Active: 1866-1936
- Country: Canada
- Branch: Canadian Militia
- Type: Rifle Regiment
- Part of: Non-Permanent Active Militia
- Garrison/HQ: Brantford, Ontario
- Engagements: First World War
- Battle honours: Somme, Arras, Vimy, and others

The Dufferin Rifles of Canada was an infantry regiment of the Canadian Non-Permanent Active Militia (now the Canadian Army) 1866-1936.

In 1936, the regiment was amalgamated with the Haldimand Rifles to form the Dufferin and Haldimand Rifles of Canada. Later that unit was converted to artillery as the 56th Field Artillery Regiment, RCA.

Notable members of the regiment included Sergeant William Merrifield, who won the Victoria Cross, and Lieutenant-General Ernest Charles Ashton.

== Lineage ==
- Originated on 28 September 1866, in Brantford, Ontario, as the 38th Brant Battalion of Infantry.
- Redesignated on 30 November 1866, as the 38th Brant Battalion of Infantry.
- Redesignated on 24 March 1871, as the 38th Brant Battalion of Rifles.
- Redesignated on 3 July 1874, as the 38th Brant Battalion or Dufferin Rifles.
- Redesignated on 28 September 1883, as the 38th Battalion Dufferin Rifles of Canada.
- Redesignated on 8 May 1900, as the 38th Regiment Dufferin Rifles of Canada.
- Redesignated on 1 May 1920, as The Dufferin Rifles of Canada.
- Amalgamated on 15 December 1936, with The Haldimand Rifles and C Company of the 3rd Machine Gun Battalion, CMGC, and Redesignated as The Dufferin and Haldimand Rifles of Canada.

=== Chart ===
Lineage chart

1856	Paris Rifle Coy
1861	No. 1 Brantford Rifle Coy
1862	No. 2 Brantford Highland Rifle Coy
1863	Mount Pleasant Infy Coy
1866	Brantford Infy Coy	Burford Infy Coy	Newport Infy Coy
1866	38th "Brant Bn of Infy"
1866	38th "Brant" Bn of Infy
1871	38th "Brant" Bn of Rifles
1874	38th "Brant" Bn or "Dufferin Rifles"
1883	38th Bn "Dufferin Rifles of Canada"
1900	38th Regt "Dufferin Rifles of Canada"
1914	4th Bn, CEF	36th Bn, CEF
1915	125th "Overseas" Bn, CEF
1916	215th "Overseas" Bn, CEF
1917	Absorbed by 3rd Reserve Bn, CEF	Absorbed by 2nd Reserve Bn, CEF
1918	Absorbed by 8th Reserve Bn, CEF
1920	Disbanded	1st Bn (4th Bn, CEF), The Dufferin Rifles of Canada	2nd Bn (36th Bn, CEF), (Note: Reserve order of battle) The Dufferin Rifles of Canada	3rd Bn (125th Bn, CEF), The Dufferin Rifles of Canada	4th Bn (215th Bn, CEF), The Dufferin Rifles of Canada
1st Bn (114th Bn, CEF), The Haldimand Rifles	C Coy, 3rd MG Bn, CMGC
1936	Disbanded	Disbanded	Disbanded
1936	The Dufferin and Haldimand Rifles of Canada

== Perpetuations ==
- 4th Battalion (Central Ontario), CEF
- 36th Battalion, CEF
- 125th Battalion (1st Overseas Battalion of 38th Regiment Dufferin Rifles), CEF
- 215th Battalion (2nd Overseas Battalion of 38th Regiment Dufferin Rifles), CEF

== Organization ==
=== 38th Brant Battalion of Infantry (28 September 1866) ===
- No. 1 Company (1st Brantford Rifles) (Brantford, Ontario) (first raised on 13 December 1861 as the 1st Brantford Rifle Company)
- No. 2 Company (2nd Brantford Rifles) (Brantford, Ontario) (first raised on 3 July 1862 as the 2nd Brantford Highland Rifle Company)
- No. 3 Company (Paris Rifles) (Paris, Ontario) (first raised on 26 June 1856 as the Volunteer Militia Company of Paris)
- No. 4 Company (Mount Pleasant Infantry) (Mount Pleasant, Ontario) (first raised on 30 January 1863 as the Mount Pleasant Infantry Company; later disbanded 6 February 1869)
- No. 5 Company (3rd Brantford Rifles) (Brantford, Ontario) (first raised on 1 June 1866 as the 3rd Brantford Infantry Company)
- No. 6 Company (Burford Infantry) (Burford, Ontario) (first raised on 17 August 1866 as the Burford Infantry Company of Volunteer Militia)
- No. 7 Company (Newport Infantry) (Newport, Ontario) (first raised on 31 August 1866 as the Newport Infantry Company; later disbanded on 14 December 1866)

=== The Dufferin Rifles of Canada (01 September, 1920) ===
- 1st Battalion (perpetuating the 4th Battalion, CEF)
- 2nd (Reserve) Battalion (perpetuating the 36th Battalion, CEF)
- 3rd (Reserve) Battalion (perpetuating the 125th Battalion, CEF)
- 4th (Reserve) Battalion (perpetuating the 215th Battalion, CEF)

== Battle honours ==
In 1929, the regiment was granted these honours for the Great War. The list is identical to the honours granted at the same time to the 4th Canadian Infantry Battalion, CEF.

- Ypres 1915, '17 (Note: Selected to be borne on colours and appointments)
- Gravenstafel
- St. Julien
- Festubert, 1915
- Mount Sorrel
- Somme, 1916
- Pozières
- Flers-Courcelette
- Ancre Heights
- Arras 1917, '18
- Vimy, 1917
- Arleux
- Scarpe, 1917, '18
- Hill 70
- Passchendaele
- Amiens
- Drocourt–Quéant
- Hindenburg Line
- Canal du Nord
- Pursuit to Mons
- France and Flanders, 1915–18
