= Field trip =

Journey by a group of people

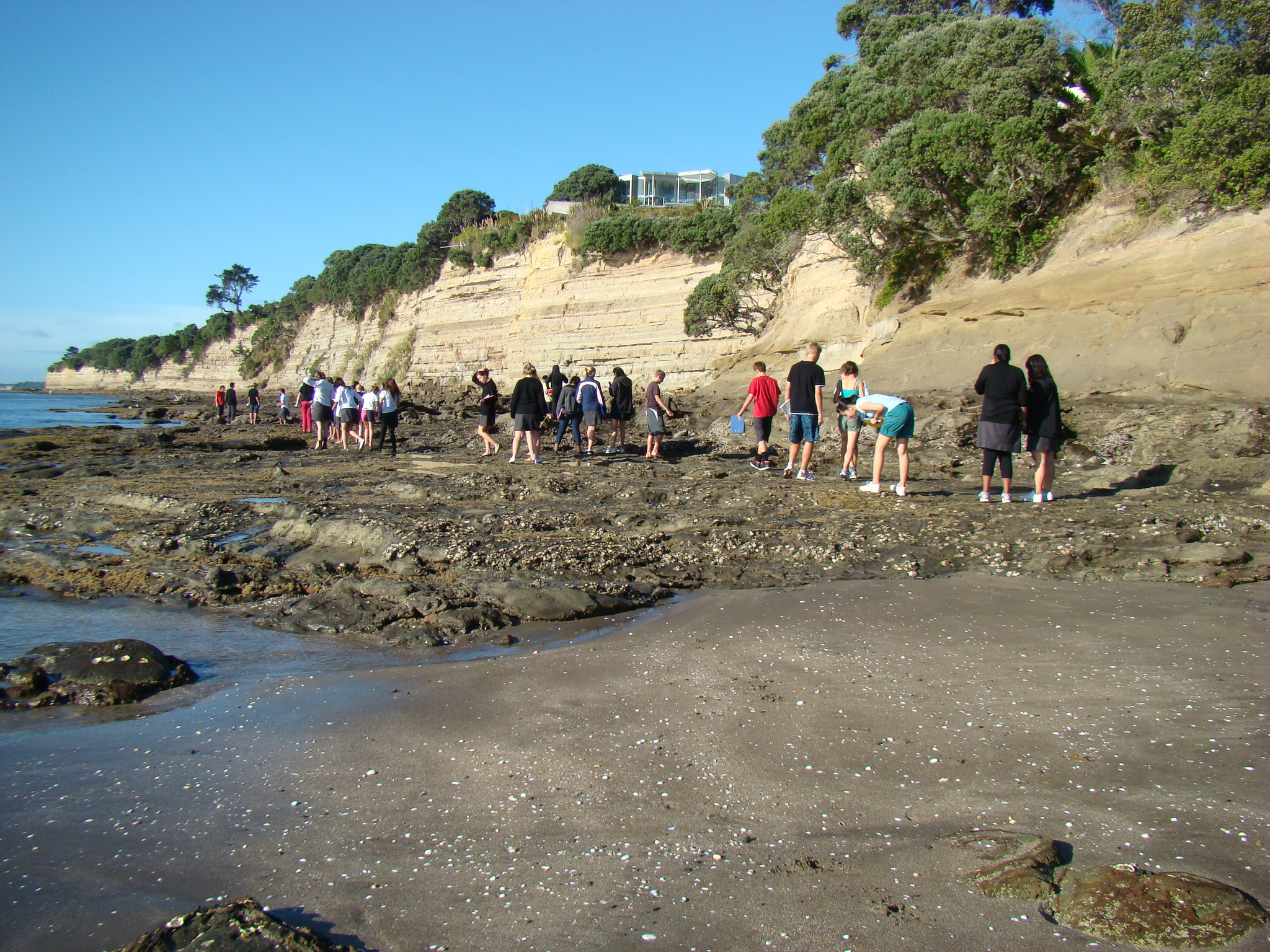
Students on a field trip to Waiake Beach in Torbay, New Zealand

A field trip or excursion is a journey by a group of associated peers, such as coworkers or school students, to a place away from their normal environment for the purpose of education or leisure, either within their country or abroad.

When arranged by a school administration for students, it is also known as school trip in the United Kingdom, Australia, Kenya, New Zealand and Bangladesh, and school tour in Ireland.

A 2022 study, which used randomized controlled trial data, found that culturally enriching field trips led students to show a greater interest in arts, greater tolerance for people with different views, and boosted their educational outcomes.

== Overview ==
The purpose of the field trip is usually observation for education, non-experimental research or to provide students with experiences outside their everyday activities, such as going camping with teachers and their classmates. The aim of this research is to observe the subject in its natural state and possibly collect samples. It is seen that more-advantaged children may have already experienced cultural institutions outside of school, and field trips provide common ground between more-advantaged and less-advantaged children to share the same cultural experiences.

Field trips often involve three steps: preparation, activities and follow-up activity. Preparation applies to both the students and the teachers. Teachers often take the time to learn about the destination and the subject before the trip. Activities on the field trips often include: lectures, tours, worksheets, videos and demonstrations. Follow-up activities are generally discussions in the classroom once the field trip is completed.

In Western culture people first come across this method during school years when classes are taken on school trips to visit a geological or geographical feature of the landscape, for example. Much of the early research into the natural sciences was of this form. Charles Darwin is an important example of someone who has contributed to science through the use of field trips.

Popular field trip sites include zoos, nature centers, community agencies such as fire stations and hospitals, government agencies, local businesses, amusement parks, science museums and factories. Field trips provide alternative educational opportunities for children and can benefit the community if they include some type of community service. Field trips also let students take a break from their normal routine and experience more hands-on learning. Places like zoos and nature centers often have an interactive display that allows children to touch plants or animals.

Today, culturally enriching field trips are in decline. Museums across the United States report a steep drop in school tours. For example, the Field Museum in Chicago at one time welcomed more than 300,000 students every year. Recently, the number is below 200,000. Between 2002 and 2007, Cincinnati arts organizations saw a 30 percent decrease in student attendance. A survey by the American Association of School Administrators found that more than half of schools eliminated planned field trips in 2010–11.

== Site school ==
A variation on the field trip is the "site-based program" or "site-school" model, where a class temporarily relocates to a non-school location for an entire week to take advantage of the resources on the site. As with a multi-day field trip, appropriate overnight camping or lodging arrangements are often made to accommodate the experience. The approach was first developed at the Calgary Zoo in Alberta, Canada in 1993, and "Zoo School" was inaugurated in 1994. The Calgary Board of Education then approached the Glenbow Museum and Archives to create a "Museum School" in 1995 followed by the Calgary Science Centre (1996), the University of Calgary (1996), Canada Olympic Park (1997), the Inglewood Bird Sanctuary (1998), Calgary City Hall (2000), Cross Conservation Area (2000), the Calgary Stampede (2002), the Calgary Aero-Space Museum (2005), and the Fire Training Academy (2008). One of the newer schools in Calgary is Tinker School and Social Enterprise School as STEM Learning Lab (2018) The model spread across Alberta (with 15 sites in Edmonton alone), throughout Canada and in the United States. Global coordination of the model is through the "Beyond the Classroom Network".

== Europe ==
In Europe, School Trip, a 2002 German-Polish film, describes the German students' trip to Poland during the summer.

== School trips in east Asia ==
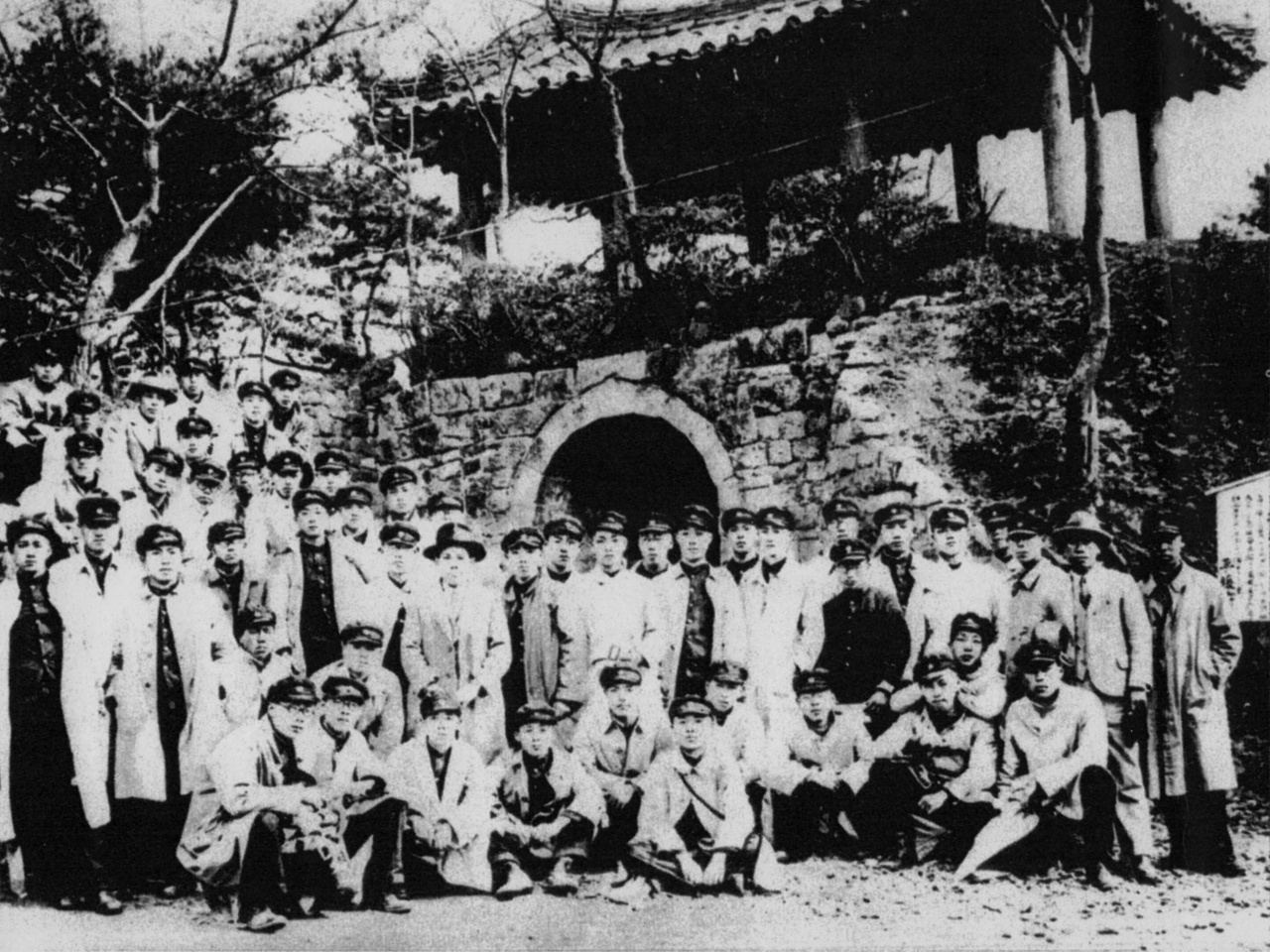
A college students group from Kyoto visiting Pyongyang (1933)

In Japan, in addition to the one-day field trip, the school trip, called shūgaku ryokō (Japanese: 修学旅行, literally "learning journey"), has a history since 1886, and is now part of the middle school and high school curriculum, with all students participating in such a program. The trip is usually longer than several days, such as a week or several weeks long. The typical locations visited within Japan are regions of national or historical significance, such as ancient capitals of Kyoto and Nara, Nagasaki, for its experience with nuclear weapons and historical significance as the sole international port during the country's 17th–19th century isolationist foreign policy Japanese: 鎖国, romanized: sakoku (さこく) and Nikkō 日光, popular onsen spa town renowned for its beauty. Travelling abroad is occasionally chosen as an option by some schools.

In other Asian regions/countries such as South Korea, Taiwan and Singapore, the school trip, when arranged, tends to become a voluntary part of the school curriculum. When Japan was selected, the Japanese government waived the entry visa.

== See also ==
- School bus
- Museum education
- Grand Tour
- Experiential learning
