= Fish and Game =

Fish and Game may refer to:

- in the United States
  - Alabama Department of Conservation and Natural Resources, formerly the Department of Game and Fish
  - Alaska Department of Fish and Game
  - Arizona Game and Fish Department
  - Arkansas Game and Fish Commission
  - California Department of Fish and Wildlife, formerly the California Department of Fish and Game
  - Idaho Department of Fish and Game
  - Massachusetts Department of Fish and Game
  - Minnesota Fish and Game Division, now the Division of Fish and Wildlife
  - New Hampshire Fish and Game Department
  - New Mexico Game and Fish Department
  - North Dakota Game and Fish Department
  - Wyoming Game and Fish Department
- elsewhere:
  - Alberta Fish and Game Association
  - Fish and Game New Zealand
