= Haldimand Rifles =

The Haldimand Rifles
- Active: 1866-1936
- Country: Canada
- Branch: Canadian Militia
- Type: Rifles
- Role: Infantry
- Size: One regiment
- Part of: Non-Permanent Active Militia
- Garrison/HQ: York, Ontario
- Engagements: Fenian Raids, First World War
- Battle honours: See #Battle Honours

The Haldimand Rifles was an infantry regiment of the Non-Permanent Active Militia of the Canadian Militia (now the Canadian Army). In 1936, the regiment was Amalgamated with The Dufferin Rifles of Canada to form The Dufferin and Haldimand Rifles of Canada (now the 56th Field Artillery Regiment, RCA).

== Lineage ==
- Originated on 28 September 1866, in York, Ontario, as the 37th Haldimand Battalion of Rifles.
- Redesignated on 8 May 1900, as the 37th Regiment Haldimand Rifles.
- Redesignated on 1 May 1920, as The Haldimand Rifles.
- Amalgamated on 15 December 1936, with The Dufferin Rifles of Canada and C Company of the 3rd Machine Gun Battalion, CMGC (now The Argyll and Sutherland Highlanders of Canada (Princess Louise's)), and Redesignated as The Dufferin and Haldimand Rifles of Canada.

=== Chart ===
Lineage chart

1856	Dunnville Rifle Coy
1862	York Rifle Coy	Caledonia Rifle Coy
1866	Oneida Infy Coy	Walpole Infy Coy	Cheapside Infy Coy
1866	37th "Haldimand Bn of Rifles"
1900	37th Regt "Haldimand Rifles"
1915	114th "Overseas" Bn, CEF
1916	Absorbed by 35th and 36th Reserve Bns, CEF
1920	1st Bn (114th Bn, CEF), The Haldimand Rifles	2nd Bn, (Note: Reserve order of battle) The Haldimand Rifles
1st Bn (4th Bn, CEF), The Dufferin Rifles of Canada	C Coy, 3rd MG Bn, CMGC
1936	Disbanded
1936	The Dufferin and Haldimand Rifles of Canada

== Perpetuations ==
- 114th Battalion (Haldimand), CEF

== History ==
=== Early history ===
With the passing of the Militia Act of 1855, the first of a number of newly raised independent militia companies were established in and around the Haldimand County-area of Canada West (now Ontario).

During the Fenian Raids, two of these companies: the York Rifle Company and the Caledonia Rifle Company of the Haldimand County Militia would see action on June 2, 1866, alongside The Queen's Own Rifles and the 13th Battalion Volunteer Militia (Infantry), Canada (now the Royal Hamilton Light Infantry) at the Battle of Ridgeway.

On 28 September 1866, the 37th Haldimand Battalion of Rifles was authorized. Its Regimental Headquarters was in York and had companies in York, Dunnville, Caledonia, Oneida, Hullsville, Cheapside and Mount Healy, Canada West (now Ontario).

On 8 May 1900, the 37th Haldimand Battalion of Rifles was Redesignated as the 37th Regiment Haldimand Rifles.

=== Great War ===
On 22 December 1915, the 114th Battalion (Haldimand), CEF was authorized for service and on 31 October 1916, the battalion embarked for Great Britain. After its arrival in the UK, on 11 November 1916, the battalion's personnel were absorbed by the 35th Reserve Battalion, CEF and the 36th Reserve Battalion, CEF to provide reinforcements for the Canadian Corps in the field. On 21 May 1917, the 114th Battalion, CEF was disbanded.

=== 1920s–1930s ===
On 1 April 1921, as a result of the Otter Commission and the following reorganization of the Canadian Militia, the 37th Regiment Haldimand Rifles was Redesignated as The Haldimand Rifles.

On 15 December 1936, as a result of the 1936 Canadian Militia Reorganization, The Haldimand Rifles was Amalgamated with The Dufferin Rifles of Canada and “C” Company of the 3rd Machine Gun Battalion, CMGC (now The Argyll and Sutherland Highlanders of Canada (Princess Louise's)), to form The Dufferin and Haldimand Rifles of Canada.

== Organization ==
=== 37th Haldimand Battalion of Rifles (28 September 1866) ===
- No. 1 Company (York, Ontario) (first raised on 27 August 1862, as the York Rifle Company)
- No. 2 Company (Dunnville, Ontario) (first raised on 24 July 1856 as the Dunnville Rifle Company)
- No. 3 Company (Caledonia, Ontario) (first raised on 27 August 1862 as the Caledonia Rifle Company)
- No. 4 Company (Oneida, Ontario) (first raised on 6 July 1866 as the Oneida Infantry Company)
- No. 5 Company (Walpole, Ontario) (first raised on 31 August 1866 as the Walpole Infantry Company)
- No. 6 Company (Cheapside, Ontario) (first raised on 14 September 1866 as the Cheapside Infantry Company)

== Battle Honours ==
- Hill 70 (Note: Selected to be borne on colours and appointments)
- Ypres, 1917

== Notable members ==
- Brigadier Oliver Milton Martin
- Colonel James Walker
