= Halderman =

Halderman is a surname. Notable people with the surname include:

- Caitlin Halderman (born 2000), Indonesian actress and singer
- J. Alex Halderman (born 1981), American computer scientist
- Joe Halderman (born 1957), American television news writer, director, and producer
- Linda Halderman (born 1968), American politician

== See also ==
- Haldeman
