= Inglewood Bird Sanctuary =

Park in Calgary, Alberta

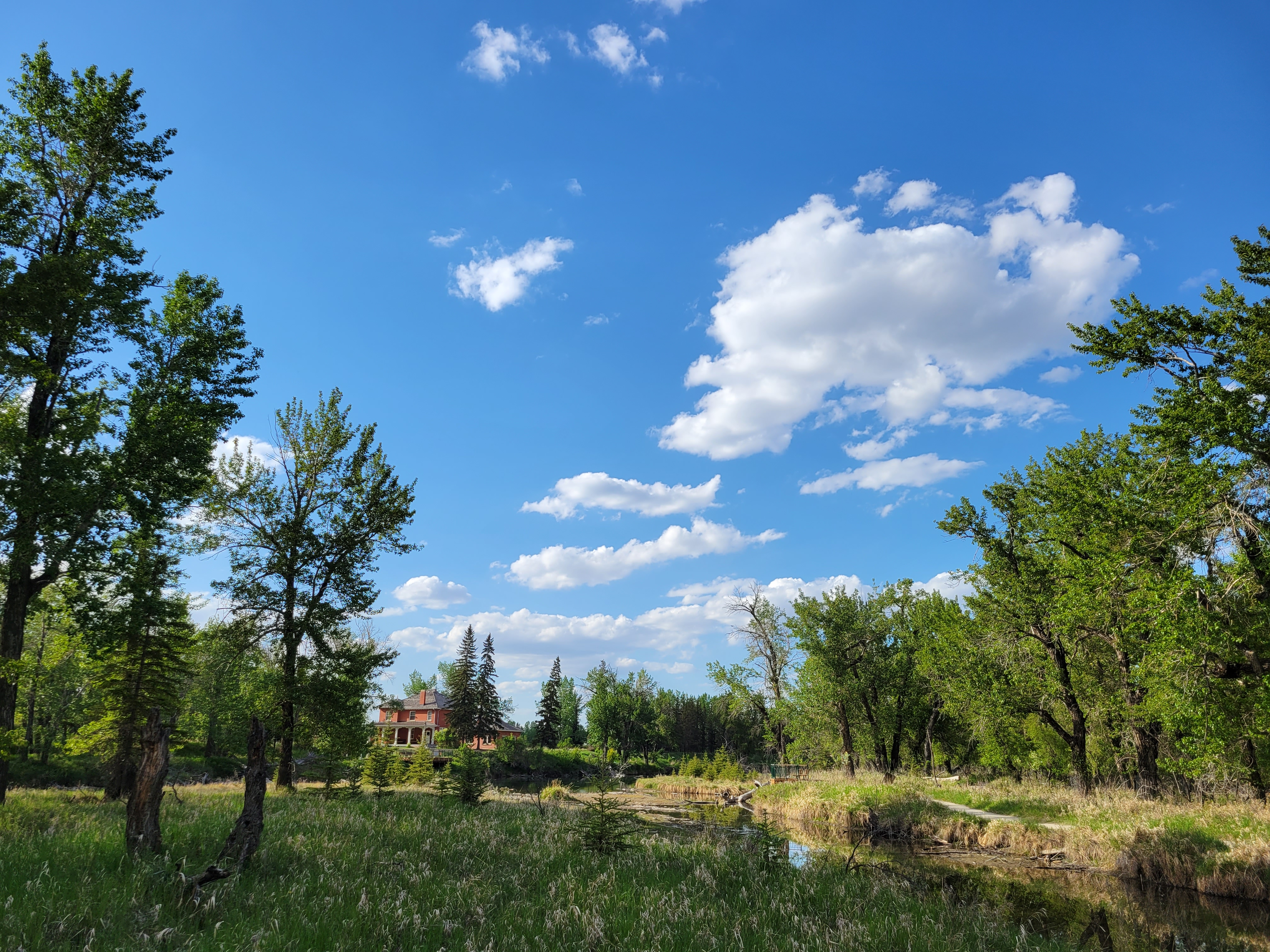
- Colonel Walker house seen from Inglewood Bird Sanctuary
- Interactive map of Inglewood Bird Sanctuary
- Type: Urban park
- Location: Calgary, Alberta, Canada
- Coordinates: 51°01′48″N 114°00′35″W
- Area: 0.36 km^{2} (0.14 sq mi)
- Operator: City of Calgary
- Open: All year

The Inglewood Bird Sanctuary is an urban park and nature reserve located along the Bow River in Calgary, Alberta, Canada. The park includes an interpretive nature centre, where educational programs and summer camps are offered. The park is a popular location for birding and wildlife viewing in the city, and is part of the Canadian Migration Monitoring Network. The historic Colonel James Walker house is also located within the park.

The park is situated within the larger Inglewood Migratory Bird Sanctuary area, which is managed by the Canadian Wildlife Service. This area consists of the Inglewood Bird Sanctuary, the Inglewood Golf and Curling Club, and part of the Canadian Pacific Railway yards.

== Wildlife ==
Inglewood Bird Sanctuary is located on the southern bank of the Bow River. It is primarily riverine forest surrounding a large central lagoon, however, the park also has of areas of grasslands, shrubs, and a small pond. This variety of habitats makes Inglewood Bird Sanctuary a common location to find birds, mammals, and plant life despite its location inside the city.

There have been 270 recorded bird species, 21 mammal species, and 347 plant species identified at Inglewood Bird Sanctuary over its entire history. Over the park's history, numerous species rarely seen in Alberta have been recorded here. This includes a scissor-tailed flycatcher in 2000, a purple sandpiper in 2013, and a juvenile yellow-crowned night heron in 2021, among others. Several species of birds commonly use the area to nest in the spring and summer, including wood ducks and European starlings. In the winter the central lagoon typically freezes over, however, the adjacent Bow River remains open. Because of this, several species of waterfowl can commonly be found here over winter, including mallards and Canada geese. Mammals such as short-tailed weasels and mule deer, as well as coyotes, can be found in the park year-round.

== History ==
The area on which the Inglewood Bird Sanctuary is located has been used by the plains First Nations for thousands of years. Archaeologists have uncovered hearths and bison bones within the park, indicating that this area may have been used as a campsite

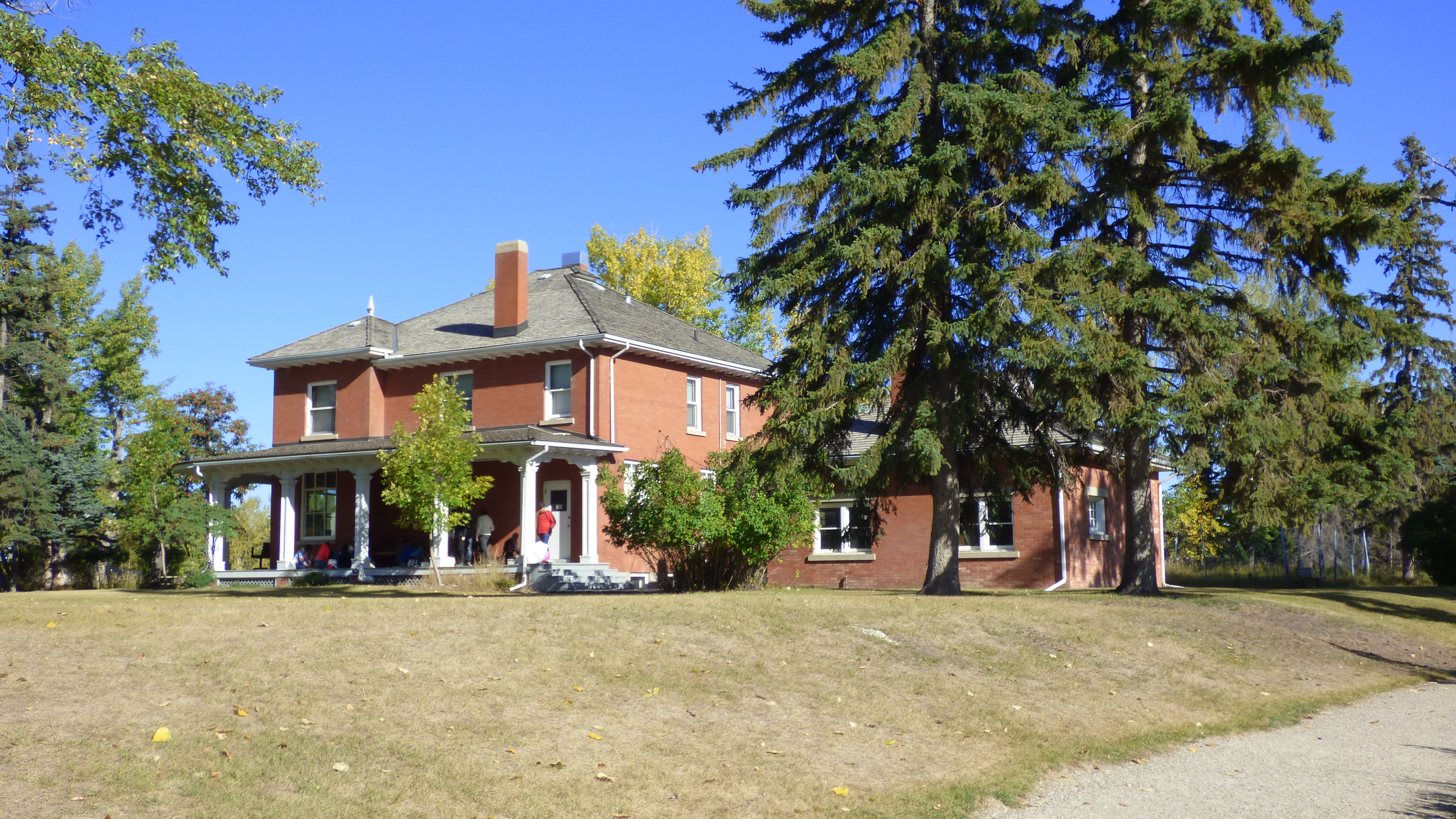
The Colonel James Walker house

In 1882, the site was settled by Colonel James Walker, who built a homestead and a sawmill on the property. In 1910, the original homestead was replaced by the current Colonel Walker house. The house is still in use today as a classroom and office for park staff.

In 1929, the family's property was designated as a federal migratory bird sanctuary by the government of Canada, after an application by Shelby Walker, Colonel Walker's son. From 1929 to 1952, part of the property was leased to several Chinese families, who used the land to establish market gardens. The property was acquired by Ed Jefferies in 1953, who leased the location to the Alberta Fish and Game Association. A pond bearing Jefferies name is located northeast of the lagoon. In 1970, Jeffries sold the sanctuary to the City of Calgary.

In March 2022, the City of Calgary began a project to reconnect the lagoon to the Bow River. The goal of the project was to improve the water quality of the lagoon while minimizing the risk of damage from future floods. The project caused the closure of a portion of the northern end of the park. The entire park reopened in October 2023.
