= 215th Battalion =

The 215th Battalion (2nd Overseas Battalion of 38th Regiment Dufferin Rifles), CEF was a unit in the Canadian Expeditionary Force during the First World War.

== History ==
Based in Brantford, Ontario, the unit began recruiting in early 1916 in the counties of Brant, Norfolk, and Haldimand. After sailing to England in April 1917, the battalion was absorbed into the 2nd Reserve Battalion on May 7, 1917.

The 215th Battalion, CEF had two Officer Commanding: Lieut-Col. H. E. Snider and Lieut-Col. H. Cockshutt.

== Perpetuations ==
In 1920, the perpetuation of the 215th Battalion, CEF was first assigned to The Dufferin Rifles of Canada, and is now held by the 56th Field Artillery Regiment, RCA.

- The Dufferin Rifles of Canada (1920–1936)
- The Dufferin and Haldimand Rifles of Canada (1936–1946)
- 56th Field Artillery Regiment, RCA (1946–Present)
