= Defence Scheme No. 2 =

1930s Canadian plan for neutrality in Japan-United States war

Defence Scheme No. 2 was a Canadian military strategy developed after the First World War that outlined the Canadian response in the event of a war between the United States and Japan. The primary concern of the strategy was remaining neutral in any conflict between the two countries.

== Origins ==
Plans for the scheme began immediately after the First World War. However, it was not greatly developed until the early 1930s, when James Sutherland Brown constructed a rough model of the strategy. The major tenet of Brown's model was the defence of the Pacific coast in the event of a war between the United States and Japan. General Andrew McNaughton would later transform the model into a commitment towards protecting Canadian neutrality. In 1933, the strategy was finalized, but it was not approved by the government until 1936.

== Issues ==
There were several issues that made the strategy of Canadian neutrality unlikely:

=== Attitudes ===
In Canada, there was an anti-Japanese and pro-American sentiment to contend with. It would have been difficult for the government to maintain neutrality and retain the support of citizens if it did not at least attempt to align with the United States.

=== Imperial ties ===
Because of Canada's imperial ties, if Britain decided to join the Americans in a war against the Japanese, it would be difficult for Canada to remain neutral. If Britain went to war, it would not include Canada by default since the Statute of Westminster in 1931 had transferred war-making powers to the Canadian Parliament, but existing ties would have made it likely for Canada to have been drawn in. (However, the Irish Free State, then a dominion within the British Empire, remained neutral throughout the Second World War. South Africa, also a dominion, also had internal challenges to a war with Germany. Dominion status was not, therefore, a guarantee in itself of military alliance with Britain.) That relationship had been untested since World War I and was intact until Canada declared war on Germany in 1939. If Britain joined in such a war, it would effectively destroy Canada’s policy of neutrality.

=== Proximity to the United States ===
The proximity between Canada and the United States made it only natural that there would be some overlap in the defence of territory. The United States was testing aircraft and flying through Canadian airspace to Alaska. If Canada allowed the United States to continue that practice, it was feared that it would lead to an unwanted situation. Effectively, Canada would be thus trying to avoid dangerous engagements between Japan or the United States.

Even though the American planes overhead were creating tension and a threat to neutrality, Canada was not willing to risk neutrality in a time of peace. The Joint Staff Committee suggested that Ottawa tell Washington that it could offer "no military commitment in advance of an actual crisis developing."

== See also ==
- Defence Scheme No. 1

== Sources ==
- Bercuson, David J. and J.L. Granatstein. Dictionary of Canadian Military History. Canada: Oxford University Press, 1992
- Granatstein, J. L. Canada's Army: Waging War and Keeping the Peace. University of Toronto Press, 2004 https://books.google.com/books?id=jqxyhNcha3sC&q=Canada%27s+Army&pg=PA171
- Perras, Galen. "‘FUTURE PLAYS WILL DEPEND ON HOW THE NEXT ONE WORKS’: FRANKLIN ROOSEVELT AND THE CANADIAN LEGATION DISCUSSIONS OF JANUARY 1938." Journal of Military and Strategic Studies, Winter 2006/07, Vol. 9, Issue 2. http://www.jmss.org/2007/2007winter/articles/perras_cont-defence.pdf%5B‍%5D
- Perras, Galen Roger and Katrina E. Kellner. "’A perfectly logical and sensible thing’: Billy Mitchell Advocates a Canadian-American Aerial Alliance against Japan." The Journal of Military History, Volume 72, Number 3, July 2008
