= Norfolk Regiment of Canada =

- Active: 1866-1936
- Country: Canada
- Branch: Canadian Militia
- Type: Rifles (1866-1928); Line infantry (1928-1936)
- Role: Infantry
- Size: One regiment
- Part of: Non-Permanent Active Militia
- Garrison/HQ: Simcoe, Ontario
- Motto(s): Latin: Pro Patria, lit. 'For Country'
- Engagements: First World War
- Battle honours: See #Battle Honours

The Norfolk Regiment of Canada was an infantry regiment of the Non-Permanent Active Militia of the Canadian Militia (now the Canadian Army). First raised in the 1860’s as The Norfolk Rifles, the regiment was converted to a Line Regiment in 1928. In 1936, the regiment was converted from infantry to artillery and now forms part of the 56th Field Artillery Regiment, RCA.

== Lineage ==
=== The Norfolk Regiment of Canada ===
- Originated on 28 September 1866, in Simcoe, Ontario as the 39th Norfolk Battalion of Rifles.
- Redesignated on 8 May 1900, as the 39th Regiment Norfolk Rifles.
- Redesignated on 1 May 1920, as The Norfolk Rifles.
- Redesignated on 15 November 1928, as The Norfolk Regiment of Canada.
- Converted to artillery on 15 December 1936, and redesignated as the 25th (Norfolk) Field Brigade, RCA (now part of the 56th Field Artillery Regiment, RCA).

=== Chart ===
Lineage chart

1866 | 39th "Norfolk Bn of Rifles"
1900 | 39th Regt "Norfolk Rifles"
1915 | 133rd "Overseas" Bn, CEF | 41st "Overseas" Fd Bty, CEF
1916 | Absorbed by 23rd Reserve Bn, CEF
1917 | Absorbed by 30th and 40th Bty, CFA, CEF
1918 | 41st Bty, CFA, CEF
1920 | Disbanded
1920 | 1st Bn (133rd Bn, CEF), The Norfolk Rifles | 2nd Battalion, The Norfolk Rifles [Reserve order of battle]
1928 | 1st Bn (133rd Bn, CEF), The Norfolk Regt of Canada | 2nd Battalion, The Norfolk Regiment of Canada
1936 | 25th (Norfolk) Fd Bde, RCA | Disbanded
1940 | 25th Reserve (Norfolk) Fd Bde, RCA
1942 | 45th Reserve (Norfolk) Fd Regt, RCA
1946 | 25th Fd Regt (Norfolk Regt), RCA
1946 | 25th Medium Regt (Norfolk Regt), RCA
56th Light Anti-Aircraft Regt (Dufferin and Haldimand Rifles), RCA
1954 | 56th Fd Regt (Dufferin and Haldimand Rifles), RCA

== Perpetuations ==
- 133rd Battalion (Norfolk's Own), CEF

== History ==
=== Early history ===
On 28 September 1866, the 39th Norfolk Battalion of Rifles was authorized for service. Its regimental headquarters was at Simcoe and had companies at Simcoe, Villa Nova, Port Rowan, Walsingham (Pleasant Hill) and Waterford, Ontario.

On 8 May 1900, the regiment was redesignated as 39th Regiment Norfolk Rifles.

=== Great War ===
On 22 December 1915, the 133rd Battalion (Norfolk's Own), CEF was authorized for service and on 30 October 1916, the battalion embarked for Great Britain. After its arrival in the UK, on 12 November 1916, the battalion’s personnel were absorbed by the 23rd Reserve Battalion, CEF to provide reinforcements for the Canadian Corps in the field. On 17 July 1917, the 133rd Battalion, CEF was disbanded.

== Organization ==
=== 39th Norfolk Battalion of Rifles (28 September 1866) ===
- Regimental Headquarters (Simcoe, Ontario)
- No. 1 Company (Villa Nova Rifles) (Villa Nova, Ontario) (first raised on 15 October 1861 as the 1st Volunteer Militia Rifle Company of the County of Norfolk)
- No. 2 Company (Fenwick Rifles) (Simcoe, Ontario) (first raised on 22 January 1862 as the Simcoe Volunteer Militia Rifle Company)
- No. 3 Company (Port Rowan Rifles) (Port Rowan, Ontario) (first raised on 23 January 1863 as the Port Rowan Volunteer Militia Rifle Company)
- No. 4 Company (Walsingham Centre Rifles) (Walsingham, Ontario) (first raised in January, 1863 as the Walsingham Volunteer Militia Rifle Company)
- No. 5 Company (Waterford, Ontario) (first raised on 17 August 1866 as the Waterford Infantry Company)
- No. 6 Company (Simcoe, Ontario) (first raised on 17 August 1866 as the Simcoe Infantry Company; later amalgamated with No. 2 Company)

=== The Norfolk Rifles (01 March, 1921) ===
- 1st Battalion (perpetuating the 133rd Battalion, CEF)
- 2nd (Reserve) Battalion

== Alliances ==
- United Kingdom - The Royal Norfolk Regiment

== Battle honours ==
- Arras, 1917 (Selected to be borne on colours and appointments)
- Hill 70

== Notable members ==
- Brigadier General James "Buster" Sutherland Brown CMG DSO
- Lieutenant Colonel David Tisdale PC
