= 125th Battalion, CEF =

The 125th Battalion (1st Overseas Battalion of 38th Regiment Dufferin Rifles), CEF was a unit in the Canadian Expeditionary Force during the First World War.

== History ==
Based in Brantford, Ontario, the unit began recruiting in late 1915 throughout Brant County. After sailing to England in August 1916, the battalion was absorbed into the 8th Reserve Battalion on April 16, 1918.

The 125th Battalion, CEF had one Officer Commanding: Lieut-Col. M. E. B. Cutcliffe.

== Perpetuations ==
In 1920, the perpetuation of the 125th Battalion, CEF was first assigned to The Dufferin Rifles of Canada, and is now held by the 56th Field Artillery Regiment, RCA.

- The Dufferin Rifles of Canada (1920-1936)
- The Dufferin and Haldimand Rifles of Canada (1936-1946)
- 56th Field Artillery Regiment, RCA (1946–Present)

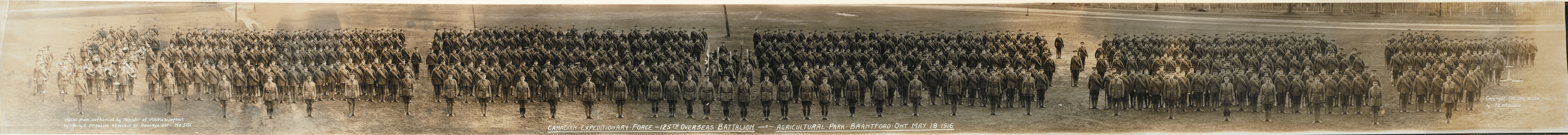
