= Ernest Charles Ashton =

Canadian soldier (1873–1956)

- Born: October 28, 1873
- Died: August 17, 1956 (aged 83)
- Military career
- Allegiance: Canada
- Branch: Canadian Militia
- Service years: 1893–1941
- Rank: Lieutenant-General
- Commands: 38th Battalion Dufferin Rifles of Canada; 36th Battalion, CEF; 15th Canadian Infantry Brigade; Chief of the General Staff
- Conflicts: World War I World War II
- Awards: Companion of the Order of the Bath; Companion of the Order of St Michael and St George; Volunteer Decoration

Lieutenant-General Ernest Charles Ashton CB, CMG, VD (1873–1956) was a Canadian soldier and Chief of the General Staff, the head of the Canadian Militia (later the Canadian Army) from 1935 until 21 November 1938. He retired from the Canadian Army in 1941.

== Military career ==
Ashton was commissioned as a provisional second lieutenant in the 38th Battalion Dufferin Rifles of Canada in 1893. Promoted to captain in 1895, major in 1902 and lieutenant colonel in 1907, he became Commanding Officer of the Dufferin Rifles that year. He was appointed Commanding Officer of the 36th Battalion, Canadian Expeditionary Force in 1914 at the start of World War I. He went on to be Commanding Officer of 9th Reserve Canadian Infantry Brigade in 1915. Promoted to brigadier in 1917, he became Commander of 15th Canadian Infantry Brigade that year.

Promoted to major-general in 1918, he became Adjutant General of the Canadian Army. He went on to be Quartermaster General in 1920, Commander Military District 2 in 1930 and Commander Military District 11 in 1933. In 1935 he was selected to be Chief of the General Staff and in 1939 he became Inspector-General of Military Forces in Canada. He retired in 1941.

He was appointed a Companion of the Order of St Michael and St George in January 1918 and a Companion of the Order of the Bath in June 1935.

Military offices
Preceded by Andrew McNaughton	Chief of the General Staff; 1935–1938	Succeeded by Thomas Victor Anderson
