= Defence Scheme No. 1 =

1921 Canadian plan to attack the United States

Date	1920s or 1930s
Location	Canada, United States and British West Indies
Status	Planned but never took place

Belligerents
United States	(United Kingdom) British Empire: Canada; United Kingdom; Newfoundland; Australia; New Zealand; India

Defence Scheme No. 1 was a war plan created by Canadian Director of Military Operations and Intelligence Lieutenant Colonel James "Buster" Sutherland Brown, for a Canadian pre-emptive attack against the United States in the (hypothetical) case of a conflict between the United States and the British Empire.

== Targets ==
Defence Scheme No. 1 was created on April 12, 1921, and detailed a surprise invasion of the northern United States as soon as possible after evidence was received of a US invasion of Canada. It assumed that the US would first attempt to capture Montreal and Ottawa and then Hamilton, Toronto, the Prairie Provinces, and Vancouver and the rest of Southwestern British Columbia. Defence Scheme No. 1's US counterpart was War Plan Red, a plan to invade Canada as part of a war with Britain that was created in 1930.

The purpose of invading the US was to allow time for Canada to prepare its war effort and to receive aid from Britain. According to the plan, Canadian flying columns stationed in Pacific Command in western Canada would immediately be sent to seize Seattle, Spokane, and Portland. Troops stationed in Prairie Command would attack Fargo and Great Falls, then advance towards Minneapolis. Troops from Quebec would be sent to seize Albany in a surprise counterattack while troops from the Maritime Provinces would invade Maine. When resistance grew, the Canadian soldiers would retreat to their own borders, destroying bridges and railways to delay US military pursuit.

== Reconnaissance ==
Brown himself did reconnaissance for the plan, along with other lieutenant-colonels, all in plainclothes, from 1921 to 1926. As historian Pierre Berton noted in his book Marching As to War, the investigation had "a zany flavour about it, reminiscent of the silent comedies of the day." To illustrate that, Berton quoted from Brown's reports, in which Brown recorded, among other things, that in Burlington, Vermont, the people were "affable" and thus unusual for Americans; that Americans drink significantly less alcohol than Canadians (it was during Prohibition), and that upon pointing that out to Americans, one responded, "My God! I'd go for a glass of beer. I'm going to 'Canady' to get some more"; that the people of Vermont would be serious soldiers only "if aroused"; and that many people in the US might be sympathetic with the British cause.

== Reaction ==
Despite Berton's description of the plan and its creator as "quixotic", Berton notes the plan had its supporters, such as General George Pearkes, who remarked that Defence Scheme No. 1 was a "fantastic desperate plan [which] just might have worked."

Christopher M. Bell, however, criticized the plan as "suicidal". Since Brown did not coordinate with the British, he did not know that the British military had no plans to send a large army to Canada on the grounds of not being able to defend its territory against the much larger United States. His plan would thus have sacrificed the best Canadian troops for no reason. Brown also did not understand the importance of keeping Halifax, Nova Scotia, one of the main targets of a US invasion, and other Atlantic ports open. Bell states that Canada's best strategy would have been, as the Americans expected, to engage in a defensive war.

In 1928, Defence Scheme No. 1 was terminated by Chief of the General Staff Andrew McNaughton, who sought peaceful US–British relations. Many of the documents relating to the scheme were accordingly destroyed.

== See also ==
- Canada–United States relations
- Defence Scheme No. 2
- War Plan Red
