= Thomas Victor Anderson =

Canadian soldier

- Born: July 4, 1881; Ottawa, Ontario, Canada
- Died: November 8, 1972 (aged 91)
- Allegiance: Canada
- Branch: Canadian Army
- Service years: 1900 - 1943
- Rank: Major-General
- Commands: Chief of the General Staff
- Conflicts: World War I World War II
- Awards: Distinguished Service Order; Canadian Forces' Decoration

Major-General Thomas Victor Anderson DSO, CD (July 4, 1881 – November 8, 1972) was a Canadian soldier and Chief of the General Staff, the head of the Canadian Army from 21 November 1938 until 6 July 1940.

== Education ==
Born in Ottawa, Ontario, Thomas Victor Anderson graduated from the Royal Military College of Canada in Kingston, Ontario in 1900, student # 433. He was commissioned as a lieutenant in 1905 and promoted to captain in 1910 and to major in 1913.

== Military career ==
Anderson served in World War I as Commander Royal Canadian Engineers for 3rd Canadian Division on the Western Front. He was mentioned in despatches four times and awarded the DSO in 1918. He was further awarded with the Russian Order of St Anne, 2nd class, with swords, the 1914–1915 Star, British War Medal and Victory Medal, finishing the war as a brevet colonel.

After the war he became an instructor at the Royal Military College of Canada. In 1925 he was promoted to lieutenant-colonel and appointed Director of Military Training & Staff Duties at National Defence Headquarters. Promoted to colonel in 1929, he became the District Officer Commanding 10th Military District and in 1933 he was made District Officer Commanding 2nd Military District. His next post was as Quartermaster-General in 1935. He was promoted to major-general in 1936 and selected to be Chief of the General Staff in 1938.

He served, during World War II, as the Inspector-General of Central Canada from 1940 and retired in 1943.

Military offices
Preceded by Ernest Charles Ashton	Chief of the General Staff; 1938–1940	Succeeded by Harry Crerar
