= 36th Battalion, CEF =

- Active: 1914-1917
- Country: Canada
- Branch: Canadian Expeditionary Force
- Type: Infantry
- Role: Infantry
- Size: One Battalion
- Engagements: First World War
- Battle honours: THE GREAT WAR 1915-17

The 36th Battalion, CEF, was an infantry battalion of the Canadian Expeditionary Force.

== History ==
The battalion was authorized on 7 November 1914, and recruited in Hamilton, Ontario and the surrounding district. The 36th Battalion embarked for Britain on 19 June 1915, where it provided reinforcements to the Canadian Corps in the field until 4 January 1917, when its personnel were absorbed by the 3rd Reserve Battalion, CEF. The battalion was disbanded on 15 September 1917.

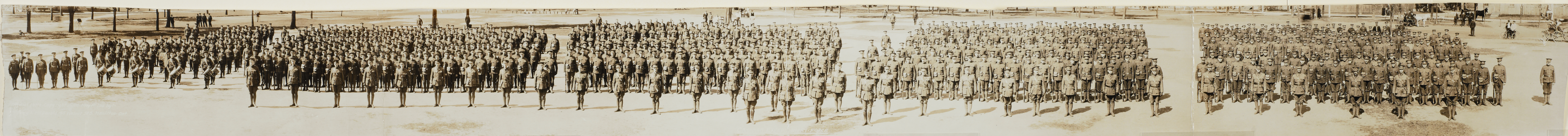
36th Battalion, Hamilton, Ontario (HS85-10-30561)

The 36th Battalion, CEF, had three Officers Commanding:

- Lt.-Col. E.C. Ashton, 16 August 1915 – 15 September 1915
- Maj. A.N. Ashton, 15 September 1915 – 24 April 1916
- Lt.-Col. W.S. Buell, 24 April 1916 – 2 January 1917

== Battle honours ==
The 36th Battalion was awarded the battle honour THE GREAT WAR 1915–17.

== Perpetuation ==
In 1920, the perpetuation of the 36th Battalion, CEF was first assigned to The Dufferin Rifles of Canada, and is now held by the 56th Field Artillery Regiment, RCA.

- The Dufferin Rifles of Canada (1920–1936)
- The Dufferin and Haldimand Rifles of Canada (1936–1946)
- 56th Field Artillery Regiment, RCA (1946–Present)

== See also ==
- List of infantry battalions in the Canadian Expeditionary Force
