= School Trip =

- Directed by: Henner Winckler
- Starring: Steven Sperling; Sophie Kempe
- Release date: 8 February 2002 (BIFF)
- Running time: 1h 26min
- Countries: Germany; Poland
- Language: German

School Trip (German: Klassenfahrt) is a 2002 German-Polish drama film directed by Henner Winckler.

== Cast ==
- Steven Sperling - Ronny
- Sophie Kempe - Isa
- Maxi Warwel - Martina
- Jakob Panzek - Steven
- Bartek Blaszczyk - Marek
- Fritz Roth - Teacher
