= Colonel James Walker =

Canadian pioneer (1846–1936)

James Walker
- Born: 14 April 1846; Carluke, Canada West
- Died: 31 March 1936 (aged 89); Calgary, Alberta
- Burial place: Burnsland Cemetery, Calgary
- Military career
- Allegiance: Canada
- Branch: NWMP; Canadian Militia
- Service years: 1866–1919
- Rank: Colonel
- Units: 37th Haldimand Battalion of Rifles; North-West Mounted Police; 15th Light Horse; Canadian Forestry Corps
- Commands: 15th Light Horse (1905–1916)
- Conflicts: Fenian Raids; North-West Rebellion; First World War

Colonel James Walker (1846–1936) was an influential pioneer, military officer and founding citizen of Calgary, Alberta. He was a leading figure in the founding days of the North-West Mounted Police and a leading pioneer in Calgary's early history. His contributions to the growth of Calgary from a collection of huts outside a fort, to a thriving city, have been described as "incalculable."

== Personal life ==
James Walker was born in Carluke, Upper Canada in what is now known as Ontario on 14 April 1846. He married Euphemia "Effie" Davidson Quarrie in Galt, Ontario on 17 May 1876. They had one son. Walker died in Calgary on 31 March 1936.

== Military service ==
Walker's first military service was in 1866 when at age 18 he took a three-month officer training course in Toronto conducted by the 2nd Battalion of the 17th Regiment of Foot. In 1871 he served with the 37th (Haldimand) Battalion of Rifles during the second Fenian campaign. Walker was a major in 1873 when he took gunnery instruction at Kingston.

=== North-West Mounted Police ===
In 1873 while taking gunnery instruction at Kingston, he drew the attention of Lieutenant-colonel George Arthur French, a founder of the North-West Mounted Police due to his effectiveness at handling both men and horses, French convinced Walker to become one of the original commissioned officers of the North-West Mounted Police. He was taken on with the rank of sub-inspector in 1873. Walker took part in the famous March West in 1874 which paved the way for European settlement of what is now Saskatchewan and Alberta. He was promoted to Superintendent in 1876 and returned east to help recruit for the force. He took new recruits to Battleford, Saskatchewan to build a fort and escort treaty commissioners. He successfully defused a confrontation with the Cree, without using violence, and was instrumental in negotiating Treaty 6.

Walker's reasonable treatment of the First Nations population gained him disfavour in Ottawa but was instrumental in keeping the peace between those peoples and the white settlers. Some criticized him for supplying food to hungry indigenous people in advance of their official rations. The natives referred to him as Pee-tee-quack-kee, "the Eagle that protects."

=== Later service ===
During the North-West Rebellion of 1885 Walker commanded a home guard in Calgary.

In 1905 Walker created the 15th Light Horse regiment, and commanded it with the rank of lieutenant-colonel. In 1911, Walker became the Honorary Lieutenant Colonel of the 23rd Alberta Rangers.

During the First World War, at the age of 70, Walker went overseas as a captain in the 238th Forestry Battalion (a unit of the Canadian Forestry Corps) and was later promoted to major. He returned to Calgary in 1919.

== Civic duty ==
Walker chaired Calgary's "Citizen's Committee" (elecfed in 1883), established a school district for Calgary, chaired the school board, directed the first general hospital and sat as president of several pioneer and police veteran associations between 1885 and 1919. He was also the first Boy Scout leader and founded the Calgary Agricultural Society, which later became the Calgary Exhibition and Stampede.

== Legacy ==
The Colonel James Walker House has been preserved by the City of Calgary as a historical site.

A school named for Walker stands at 1921 9 Ave SE Calgary, AB, T2G 0V3. An earlier school named Colonel James Walker was converted into a military museum in 1990.

In 1975, as part of the city of Calgary's centennial commemorations, the city declared him the "Citizen of the Century."
