= Haldeman =

Haldemann, Haldimann, frenchised Haldimand, anglicised Haldeman or in variants is a Swiss German surname of Emmental origin, derived from „Halde“ and „Mann“ (literally „heap“ in the sense of side, slope, and „man“; i.e. a man living on a mountainside).

Other anglicised forms of the name include Holdeman, Holdiman, Holderman and others. The forms Haldemann and Haldimann are still predominantly found in German-speaking Switzerland.

== Switzerland ==
Horben, between Eggiwil and Signau, is the ancestral home of the family. In 1444, a Hänsli Haldemann is documented there, from 1597 (until 1917) the Horben estate belonged to the Haldemann family.

The family name then became established in the 15th and 16th century in the villages and farms of the region (Langnau, Signau, Grosshöchstetten, and Eggiwil). Some older sources says that the Haldemann came from Winterthur in 1374 or 1397, but today this is in doubt.

In 1538 and 1670/71 the name appeared in Anabaptist records in Eggiwil in Emmental, Canton of Bern.

Those of Signau, Bowil and Mullen later called themselves Haldimann. Those who emigrated to Yverdon in 1694 called themselves Haldimand (i.e. Frederick Haldimand). Some from Walkringen went to the Jura Mountains of Neuchâtel in the 18th century and became citizens of Valangin, Le Locle and Les Brenets.

It is almost impossible to reconstruct a continuous genealogy of the family because of: the frequent repetition of the same forenames, such as Peter, Hans, Ulrich, Christian, used by the various branches of the family over many generations; the gaps in the church records; and the fact that the area in which they lived was an Anabaptist centre at the time of the Reformation (Anabaptist marriages and deaths are not recorded in the church books).

Notable people with the surname Haldemann, Haldimann or Haldimand include:

- Frederick Haldimand (1718–1791), Swiss-born army officer and governor of Quebec
- Peter Frederick Haldimand (1741 or 1742–1765), Swiss-born British army officer and surveyor
- William Haldimand (1784–1862), director of Bank of England
- Gertrud Haldimann (1907–2001), Swiss opponent of women's suffrage in Switzerland
- Eva Haldimann (1927–2019), Swiss literary critic and translator
- Alexandre Haldemann (born 1995), Swiss swimmer

== Mennonite emigration to Pennsylvania ==
In 1727 three Mennonite brothers (Niklaus, Hans and Michael Haldimann), their wives and children left the canton of Bern and emigrated to Montgomery County, Pennsylvania. The forms of the name ending in -man are not seldom among Americans of originally Swiss German and later Pennsylvania German Mennonite origin of the paternal lineage.

Notable US people with the surname Haldeman include:

- Samuel Stehman Haldeman (1812–1880), U.S. naturalist and philologist
- Walter Newman Haldeman (1821–1902), U.S. newspaper publisher, businessman, Major League Baseball owner
- Jacob S. Haldeman (1823–1889), U.S. banker, politician and ambassador
- Richard Jacobs Haldeman (1831–1886), U.S. politician
- Joshua N. Haldeman (1902–1974), father of Maye Musk (born 1948) and grandfather of Elon Musk
- E. Haldeman-Julius (1889–1951), and Anna Marcet Haldeman (died 1941), U.S. publishers
- H. R. Haldeman (1926–1993), U.S. politician; White House Chief of Staff (1969–1973) under President Richard Nixon, convicted in Watergate scandal
- Jack C. Haldeman II (1941–2002), U.S. biologist and science fiction writer
- Joe Haldeman (born 1943), U.S. science fiction writer
- Charles E. Haldeman (born 1948), U.S. entrepreneur

== See also ==
- Haldeman, Kentucky
