= 133rd Battalion (Norfolk's Own), CEF =

Canadian army unit during the First World War

- Pin design for the 133rd Battalion (Norfolk's Own), CEF
- Active: December 22, 1915-July 17, 1917
- Country: Canada
- Branch: Army
- Part of: Canadian Expeditionary Force
- Garrison/HQ: Simcoe, Ontario

The 133rd Battalion (Norfolk's Own), CEF was a unit in the Canadian Expeditionary Force during the First World War.

Based in Simcoe, Ontario, Canada, the unit began recruiting during the later months of 1915 in Norfolk County; recruiting more than 400 men in the process. After sailing to England in November 1916, the battalion was absorbed into the 23rd Reserve Battalion, CEF on November 11, 1916, in order to provide reinforcements for the Canadian Corps who were active in the field. The 133rd Battalion (Norfolk's Own), CEF had one officer commanding: Lieutenant-Colonel A. C. Pratt. The battalion was disbanded on July 17, 1917.

The 133rd Battalion is perpetuated by the 56th Field Artillery Regiment, RCA.
