= 56th Field Artillery Regiment, RCA =

- 56^{e} Régiment d'artillerie de campagne, ARC
- Active: 1954 as 56th Field Regiment
- Country: Canada
- Branch: Canadian Army
- Type: Field artillery
- Size: 3 batteries
- Part of: 31 Canadian Brigade Group
- Garrison/HQ: Brantford, Ontario
- Mottos: Ubique (Latin for 'everywhere'), Quo fas et gloria ducunt (Latin for 'whither right and glory lead')
- March: Quick: "British Grenadiers"
- Battle honours: Detroit; Queenston Heights; Niagara; Defence of Canada, 1812–15
- Website: www.canada.ca/en/army/corporate/4-canadian-division/56-field-artillery-regiment.html

Commanders
- Current commander: Lieutenant Colonel Tariq Rasheed

The 56th Field Artillery Regiment, Royal Canadian Artillery is a Canadian Army Reserve artillery regiment. The regiment's headquarters is in Brantford, Ontario, with batteries in St. Catharines and Simcoe. The regiment is currently part of 2nd Canadian Division's 31 Canadian Brigade Group.

== Allocated batteries ==
- 10th Field Battery, RCA (St Catharines)
- 54th Field Battery, RCA (Brantford)
- 69th Field Battery, RCA (Simcoe)

== Operational history ==
=== Great War ===
The 4th Battalion (Central Ontario), CEF, was authorized on 10 August 1914 and embarked for Britain on 3 October 1914. It disembarked in France on 12 February 1915, where it fought as part of the 1st Infantry Brigade, 1st Canadian Division in France and Flanders until the end of the war. The battalion was disbanded on 30 August 1920.

The 36th Battalion, CEF, was authorized on 7 November 1914 and embarked for Britain on 19 June 1915. The battalion provided reinforcements to the Canadian Corps in the field until 4 January 1917, when its personnel were absorbed by the 3rd Reserve Battalion, CEF. The battalion was disbanded on 15 September 1917.

The 114th Battalion (Haldimand), CEF, was authorized on 22 December 1915 and embarked for Britain on 31 October 1916. Its personnel were absorbed by the 35th Reserve Battalion, CEF and the 36th Reserve Battalion, CEF on 11 November 1916 to provide reinforcements for the Canadian Corps in the field. The battalion was disbanded on 21 May 1917.

The 125th Battalion (1st Overseas Battalion of 38th Regiment Dufferin Rifles), CEF, was authorized on 22 December 1915 and embarked for Britain on 7 August 1916. The battalion provided reinforcements to the Canadian Corps in the field until February 1917, when it was allotted to the 14th Infantry Brigade, 5th Canadian Division in England. On 16 April 1918 its personnel were absorbed by the 8th Reserve Battalion, CEF. The battalion was disbanded on 29 November 1918.

The 133rd Battalion (Norfolk's Own), CEF was authorized on 22 December 1915 and embarked for Britain on 30 October 1916, where its personnel were absorbed by the 23rd Reserve Battalion, CEF on 12 November 1916 to provide reinforcements for the Canadian Corps in the field. The battalion was disbanded on 17 July 1917.

The 215th Battalion (2nd Overseas Battalion of 38th Regiment Dufferin Rifles), CEF was authorized on 15 July 1916 and embarked for Britain on 29 April 1917, where its personnel were absorbed by the 2nd Reserve Battalion, CEF on 18 May 1917 to provide reinforcements for the Canadian Corps in the field. The battalion was disbanded on 1 September 1917.

The 41st Battery, Canadian Field Artillery, CEF was authorized on 22 December 1915 and embarked for Britain on 18 August 1915. The battery disembarked in France on 14 July 1916, where it provided artillery support as part of the 11th Brigade, CFA, CEF in France and Flanders until 24 March 1917, when its personnel were absorbed by the 30th Battery, CFA, CEF and the 40th Battery, CFA, CEF. The battery was disbanded on 1 November 1920.

=== Second World War ===
The Dufferin and Haldimand Rifles of Canada mobilized The Dufferin and Haldimand Rifles of Canada, CASF for active service on 24 May 1940. It was redesignated the 1st Battalion, The Dufferin and Haldimand Rifles of Canada, CASF on 7 November 1941. It served in Canada in a home defence role as part of the 17th Canadian Infantry Brigade, 7th Canadian Infantry Division. The battalion was disbanded on 8 March 1945.

== Notable soldiers ==
- William Merrifield VC MM
- Oliver Milton Martin

== Lineage ==
=== 56th Field Artillery Regiment, RCA ===
- Originated 28 September 1866 in York, Ontario on as the 37th "Haldimand Battalion of Rifles"
- Redesignated 8 May 1900 as the 37th Regiment "Haldimand Rifles"
- Redesignated 1 May 1920 as The Haldimand Rifles
- Amalgamated 15 December 1936 with The Dufferin Rifles of Canada and 'C Company' of the 3rd Machine Gun Battalion, CMGC (now The Argyll and Sutherland Highlanders of Canada (Princess Louise's)) and redesignated as The Dufferin and Haldimand Rifles of Canada
- Redesignated 7 November 1940 as the 2nd (Reserve) Battalion, The Dufferin and Haldimand Rifles of Canada
- Redesignated 1 June 1945 as The Dufferin and Haldimand Rifles of Canada
- Converted 1 April 1946 to artillery on and redesignated as the 56th Light Anti-Aircraft Regiment (Dufferin and Haldimand Rifles), RCA
- Amalgamated 1 October 1954 with the 25th Medium Regiment (Norfolk Regiment), RCA', and redesignated as the 56th Field Regiment (Dufferin and Haldimand Rifles), RCA
- Redesignated 12 April 1960 as the 56th Field Artillery Regiment (Dufferin and Haldimand Rifles), RCA
- Redesignated 20 November 1975 as the 56th Field Artillery Regiment, RCA

=== Chart ===
Lineage chart

1812	The Provincial Arty Coy	Provincial Royal Arty Drivers (The Car Bde)	1st and 2nd Regts of Norfolk Militia (1812–1815)
1815	Disbanded	Disbanded	Disbanded
1856	Independent infy and rifle coys	Independent infy and rifle coys
1866	37th "Haldimand Bn of Rifles"	38th "Brant Bn of Infy"
1866	38th "Brant" Bn of Infy	39th "Norfolk Bn of Rifles"
1871	38th "Brant" Bn of Rifles
1874	38th "Brant" Bn or "Dufferin Rifles"
1883	38th Bn "Dufferin Rifles of Canada"
1900	37th Regt "Haldimand Rifles"	38th Regt "Dufferin Rifles of Canada"	39th Regt "Norfolk Rifles"
1914	4th Bn, CEF	36th Bn, CEF
1915	114th "Overseas" Bn, CEF	125th "Overseas" Bn, CEF	133rd "Overseas" Bn, CEF
1916	Absorbed by 35th and 36th Reserve Bns	215th "Overseas" Bn, CEF	Absorbed by 23rd Reserve Bn
1917	Absorbed by 3rd Reserve Bn	Absorbed by 2nd Reserve Bn
1918	Absorbed by 8th Reserve Bn
1920	Disbanded
1920	1st Bn (114th Bn, CEF), The Haldimand Rifles	1st Bn (4th Bn, CEF), The Dufferin Rifles of Canada	2nd Bn (36th Bn, CEF), (Note: Reserve) The Dufferin Rifles of Canada	3rd Bn (125th Bn, CEF), The Dufferin Rifles of Canada	4th Bn (215th Bn, CEF), The Dufferin Rifles of Canada	1st Bn (133rd Bn, CEF), The Norfolk Rifles
1928	1st Bn (133rd Bn, CEF), The Norfolk Regt of Canada
1936	The Dufferin and Haldimand Rifles of Canada	Disbanded	Disbanded	Disbanded	25th (Norfolk) Fd Bde, RCA
1940	The Dufferin and Haldimand Rifles of Canada, CASF	2nd (Reserve) Bn, The Dufferin and Haldimand Rifles of Canada	25th Reserve (Norfolk) Fd Bde, RCA
1941	1st Bn, The Dufferin and Haldimand Rifles of Canada, CASF
1942	45th Reserve (Norfolk) Fd Regt, RCA
1945	Disbanded	The Dufferin and Haldimand Rifles of Canada
1946	56th LAA Regt (Dufferin and Haldimand Rifles), RCA	25th Fd Regt (Norfolk Regt), RCA
1946	25th Medium Regt (Norfolk Regt), RCA
1954	56th Fd Regt (Dufferin and Haldimand Rifles), RCA
1960	56th Fd Arty Regt (Dufferin and Haldimand Rifles), RCA
1975	56th Fd Arty Regt, RCA
2012	Perpetuates War of 1812 units

=== The Dufferin Rifles of Canada ===
- Originated 28 September 1866 in Brantford, Ontario as the 38th "Brant Battalion of Infantry"
- Redesignated 30 November 1866 as the 38th "Brant" Battalion of Infantry
- Redesignated 24 March 1871 as the 38th "Brant" Battalion of Rifles
- Redesignated 3 July 1874 as the 38th "Brant" Battalion or "Dufferin Rifles"
- Redesignated 28 September 1883 as the 38th Battalion "Dufferin Rifles of Canada"
- Redesignated 8 May 1900 as the 38th Regiment "Dufferin Rifles of Canada"
- Redesignated 1 May 1920 as The Dufferin Rifles of Canada
- Amalgamated 15 December 1936 with The Haldimand Rifles and C Company of the 3rd Machine Gun Battalion, CMGC

=== 25th Medium Regiment (Norfolk Regiment), RCA ===
- Originated 28 September 1866 in Simcoe, Ontario, as the 39th "Norfolk Battalion of Rifles"
- Redesignated 8 May 1900 as the 39th Regiment "Norfolk Rifles"
- Redesignated 1 May 1920 as The Norfolk Rifles
- Redesignated 15 November 1928 as The Norfolk Regiment of Canada
- Converted 15 December 1936 to artillery and designated as the 25th (Norfolk) Field Brigade, RCA
- Redesignated 7 November 1940 as the 25th Reserve (Norfolk) Field Brigade, RCA
- Redesignated 5 September 1942 as the 25th Reserve (Norfolk) Field Regiment, RCA
- Redesignated 1 April 1946 as the 25th Field Regiment (Norfolk Regiment), RCA
- Redesignated 28 November 1946 as the 25th Medium Regiment (Norfolk Regiment), RCA
- Amalgamated 1 October 1954 with the 56th Light Anti-Aircraft Regiment (Dufferin and Haldimand Rifles), RCA

== Perpetuations ==
=== War of 1812 ===
- The Provincial Royal Artillery Drivers (The Car Brigade)
- The 1st Regiment of Norfolk Militia
- The 2nd Regiment of Norfolk Militia

=== Great War ===
- 41st Battery, Canadian Field Artillery, CEF
- 4th Battalion (Central Ontario), CEF
- 36th Battalion, CEF
- 114th Battalion (Haldimand), CEF
- 125th Battalion (1st Overseas Battalion of 38th Regiment Dufferin Rifles), CEF
- 133rd Battalion (Norfolk's Own), CEF
- 215th Battalion (2nd Overseas Battalion of 38th Regiment Dufferin Rifles), CEF.

== Order of precedence ==
Preceded by 49th Field Artillery Regiment, RCA	56th Field Artillery Regiment, RCA	Succeeded by 62nd Field Artillery Regiment, RCA of Royal Canadian Artillery Regiments
