= Frederick Haldimand =

Swiss army officer and colonial administrator (1718–1791)

Lieutenant-General Sir Frederick Haldimand KB
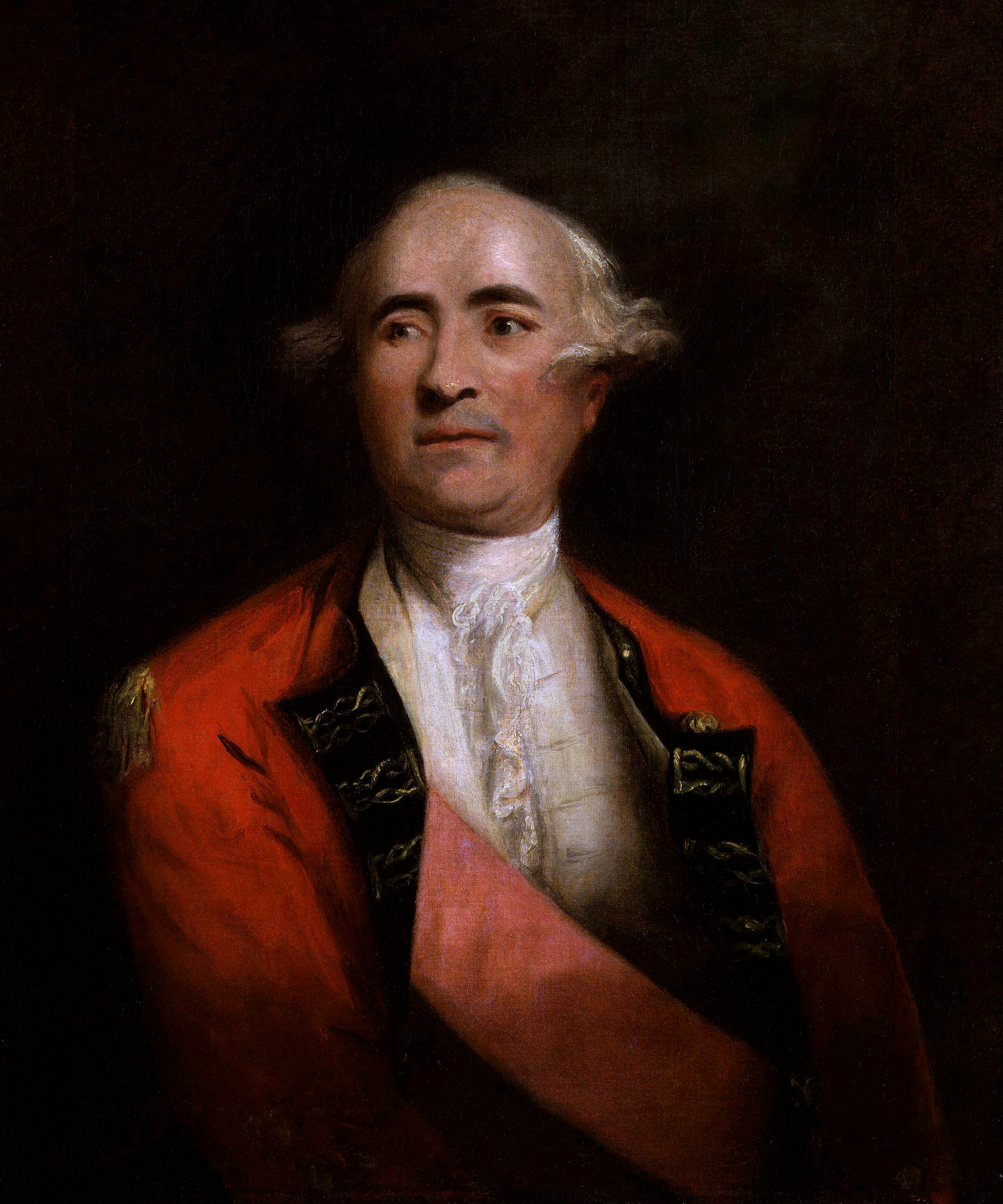
- Portrait by Sir Joshua Reynolds, c. 1778

Governor of Quebec
- In office 1778–1786
- Monarch: George III
- Preceded by: Guy Carleton
- Succeeded by: Guy Carleton

Personal details
- Born: François Louis Frédéric Haldimand; 11 August 1718 Yverdon, Switzerland
- Died: 5 June 1791 (aged 72) Yverdon, Switzerland
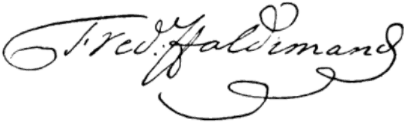
- Signature

Military service
- Allegiance: Prussia; Dutch Republic; Great Britain
- Branch/service: Prussian Army; Dutch States Army; British Army
- Years of service: 1740–1786
- Rank: Lieutenant-general (Great Britain)
- Commands: Military governor of Trois-Rivières, Quebec; Military command of East and West Florida acting Commander-in-Chief, North America; Colonel commandant, Royal American Regiment
- Battles/wars: War of the Austrian Succession; French and Indian War; Battle of Carillon; Montreal Campaign; Battle of the Thousand Islands; American War of Independence

Lieutenant-General Sir Frederick Haldimand, KB (born François Louis Frédéric Haldimand; 11 August 1718 – 5 June 1791) was a Swiss army officer and colonial administrator best known for his service in the British Army in North America during the Seven Years' War and the American Revolutionary War. From 1778 to 1786, he served as Governor of the Province of Quebec, during which time he oversaw military operations against the northern frontiers in the war, and engaged in ultimately fruitless negotiations to establish the independent Vermont Republic as a new British province. His administration of Quebec was at times harsh, with the detention of numerous political dissidents and agitators.

== Early life and career ==
Haldimand was born in Yverdon, Vaud, Switzerland on 11 August 1718. He was the second of four sons of François Louis Haldimand, a notary and civil servant, and Marie-Madeleine de Treytorrens. His grandfather, Gaspard Haldimand, was a cooper who moved from Thun to Yverdon in 1671. Haldimand received only a limited education and became interested in the military at an early age.

In 1740, Haldimand joined the Prussian Army as a mercenary. During the War of the Austrian Succession he fought at the Battle of Mollwitz, and probably also saw action at Hohenfriedberg and Kesselsdorf. He next joined the Swiss Guards of the Dutch States Army in 1748, rising to the rank of lieutenant colonel in 1750. There he formed a friendship with Henry Bouquet, another Swiss mercenary, with whom he would serve in the British Army.

== French and Indian War ==
In 1755, as the Seven Years' War, whose North American theatre is also known as the French and Indian War, was in its early stages, Haldimand and Bouquet joined a British regiment composed of German and Swiss men recruited at first from the armies of Europe, but then also from German-speaking settlers in North America. The formation of the regiment, known as the Royal American, took two years and was beset by culture clashes with the rest of the British Army. However, Haldimand and Bouquet earned the respect of the British military establishment with their dedicated professionalism.

While Haldimand's battalion was sent to Louisbourg in 1758, Haldimand himself served under General James Abercrombie at the disastrous Battle of Carillon at which he suffered minor wounds.

After spending the winter in command of the forward British position at Fort Edward, he was made second in command on the 1759 expedition of John Prideaux against Fort Niagara and was placed in charge of the key supply and communication point at Oswego, New York, where he oversaw the construction of Fort Ontario.

When Prideaux was killed early during the Battle of Fort Niagara, Haldimand went to assume command of the operation, but William Johnson, the Indian agent on the expedition who took over, refused to relinquish control. Haldimand returned to Oswego, where he remained throughout the winter.

In 1760, he joined General Jeffery Amherst's army as it descended the Saint Lawrence River, and was the officer who formally took control of Montreal on September 8 following the French surrender. He was given the responsibility for working with the outgoing French leadership as they prepared to depart for France, serving first under Amherst and then under General Thomas Gage.

In 1762, Amherst promoted him to colonel and temporarily gave him the military governorship of Trois-Rivières while its governor, Ralph Burton, was called to serve in the Caribbean. At Trois-Rivières, he oversaw the development of the ironworks at nearby Saint Maurice and arranged for his nephew Peter Frederick Haldimand to serve under James Murray, the military governor of Quebec City.

== Pre-American Revolution years ==
In 1764, the province of Quebec was turned over to a civil administration, and Haldimand's role was reduced to that of a troop commander. Denied leave to return to Europe, he remained in Quebec until 1765, when his command was merged into another. He traveled to New York with the intention of returning to Europe, but the death of his friend Bouquet led to his promotion to brigadier general and assignment to Bouquet's post as military head of the Southern Department, with responsibility for military affairs in East and West Florida. He remained in this post, which he characterized as "the most disagreeable" of his life, until 1773. Despite good relations with the civil governors, he had ongoing problems with supply and funding, and the high cost of living there put him into debt. He was promoted to colonel commandant of the Royal American in 1772, and received a pro forma promotion to major general later that year.

== American Revolution and American Revolutionary War ==
General Gage called Haldimand to New York in 1773 to temporarily act as commander-in-chief of North America while he went to England on leave. While Haldimand's command was uneventful, the political climate in the provinces noticeably declined, and he carefully resisted bringing troops in conflict with the population by refusing to get involved in the jurisdictional disputes over the New Hampshire Grants and refusing to protect tea shipments after the Boston Tea Party unless specifically requested to do so.

When Gage returned to Boston in 1774, Haldimand remained in command of the troops in New York, which Gage ordered to Boston in September 1774 in the wake of the colonial uprising known as the Powder Alarm. While Gage was primarily occupied with his duties as Governor of Massachusetts, Haldimand commanded the army in Boston although Gage did not notify him of the expedition that led to the Battles of Lexington and Concord on April 19, 1775. With the arrival additional military leadership in Boston after that event, Haldimand was advised that his status as a foreigner made it inappropriate for him to exercise command in what was viewed as an internal civil conflict. He sailed from Boston in June 1775 (one day before the Battle of Bunker Hill), and arrived in London in August.

=== Governor of Province of Quebec ===
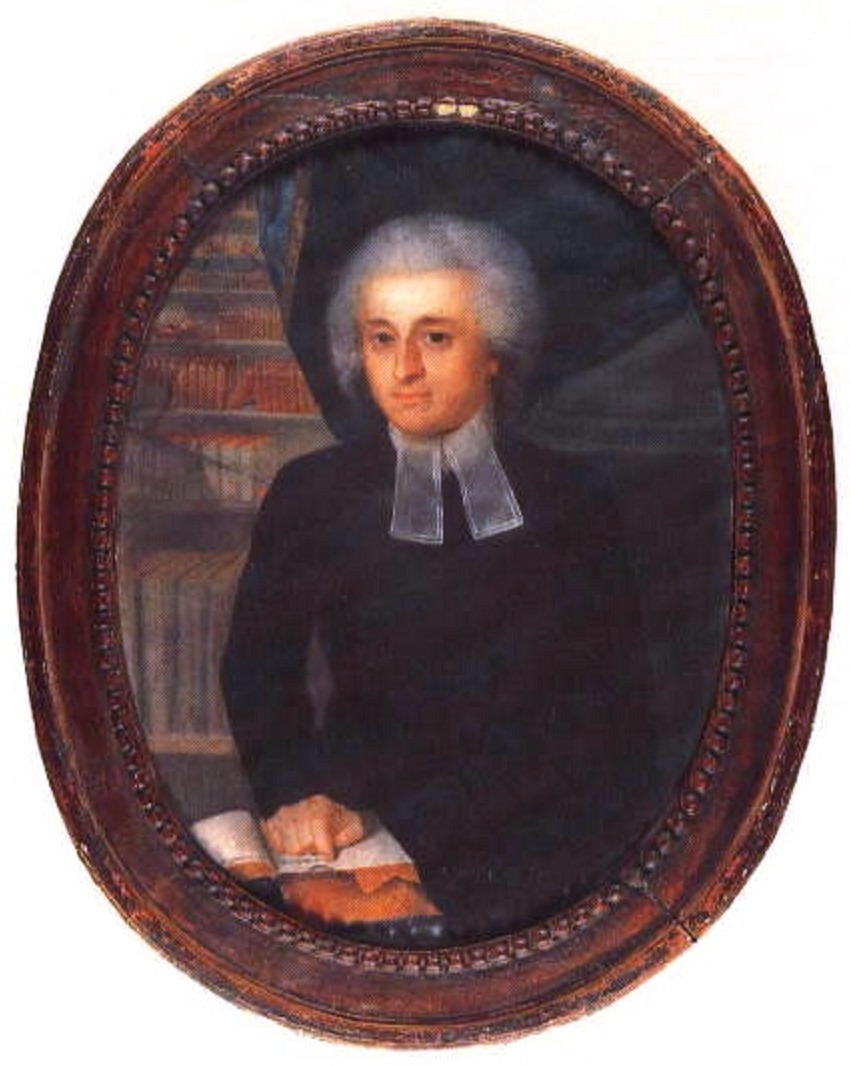
Fleury Mesplet, whom Haldimand had arrested for sedition

Haldimand became Governor of the Province of Quebec (which at the time included what is now Ontario) in 1778, and served through the American Revolution. Haldimand built up Quebec's defenses in reaction to repeated rumors of American plans to again invade the province and limited offensive actions to raiding parties such as the 1778 raid by Christopher Carleton and the 1780 "Burning of the Valleys" into the rebellious American colonies. As an administrator, he at times dealt harshly with political activists by arresting Fleury Mesplet and Valentin Jautard, publishers of a literary journal that often featured political commentary, and Pierre du Calvet, an agitator for judicial reforms.

In 1781, Haldimand's efforts on behalf of the British cause included engaging in negotiations with political representatives of the Vermont Republic, which had declared its independence from the state of New York in 1777 after long-standing disputes over jurisdiction. These negotiations, which are sometimes called the Haldimand Affair because of his participation, involved brothers Ira and Ethan Allen, and were promoted to see if Vermont could be convinced to become a new British province, which would then provide a new avenue for attack against the southern portions of New York and New England. The negotiations had reached the point that Haldimand believed Vermont was almost ready to admit British troops when news of the surrender at Yorktown arrived.

As the revolution came to an end by the Treaty of Paris, Haldimand helped settle American Loyalist refugees, who became known as United Empire Loyalists, many in territories that are now in New Brunswick and Ontario. He and Sir John Johnson, his Superintendent of Indian Affairs, also helped settle the Iroquois who had been driven out of New York during the war by issuing what is now known as the Haldimand Proclamation, which awarded them a tract of land on the Grand River in what is now known as Ontario's Six Nations reserve.

== Later life ==
In the summer of 1784, Frederick Haldimand returned to England, on leave, but he was not to return to Quebec, as he was formally replaced by General Carleton in 1786. In 1785, he was awarded the Order of the Bath. He settled in London, but made regular visits to his hometown of Yverdon, where he died, on 5 June 1791, while on one of his visits.

Haldimand never married, and in his will he left all his property to his nephew Anthony Francis Haldimand, father of future MP and director of the Bank of England William Haldimand.

== Legacy ==
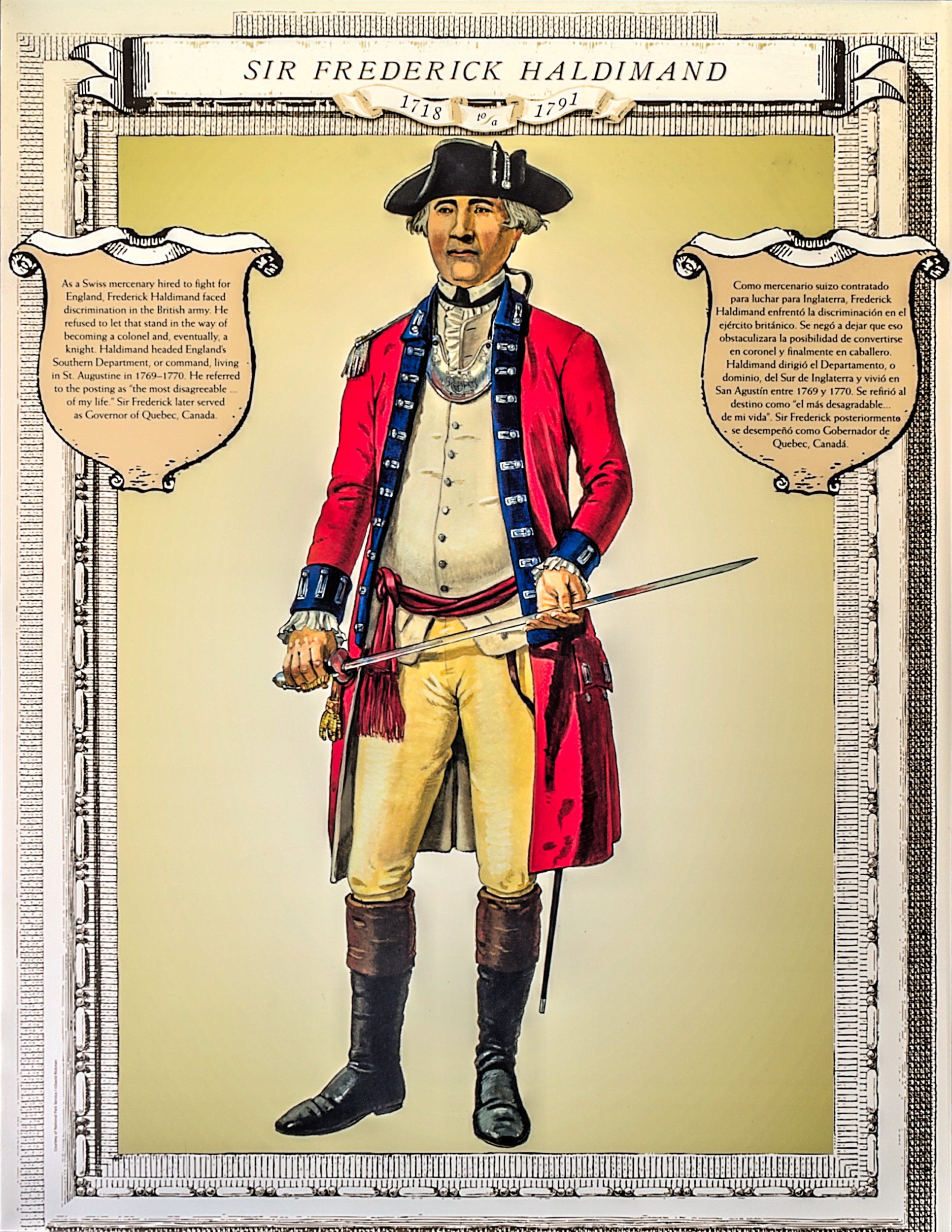
Portrait of Haldimand at Castillo de San Marcos

Haldimand created and preserved a great deal of written correspondence, especially during his time in North America. As his military and administrative assignments ranged from Pensacola to Quebec and covered the years 1755 to 1784, this correspondence, much of it deposited in the Haldimand Collection at the British Museum (with copies at the Library and Archives Canada), provides a unique view into the colonial history leading to United States independence.

Haldimand has been memorialized with several place names in North America:

- in Canada:
  - Haldimand County, Ontario; and Fort Haldimand at the Royal Military College of Canada in Kingston, Ontario, the latter named after him in 1949.
  - Haldimand River in Prince Edward Island
  - Haldimand Beach (Plage Haldimand in French), Cape Haldimand (Cap Haldimand) and the unincorporated places of Haldimand East and Haldimand West, all four near the town of Gaspé, Quebec;
  - Haldimand Cliff (Falaise Haldimand) on Brion Island in the Magdalen Islands archipelago in Quebec
- in the United States:
  - Haldimand Bay is the main harbor all boats enter to land at Mackinac Island, Michigan.

== Notes ==
Government offices
Preceded by Sir Guy Carleton	Governor General of British North America; 1778–1786	Succeeded by The Lord Dorchester
