= James Sutherland Brown =

Canadian military officer (1881–1951)

James "Buster" Sutherland Brown
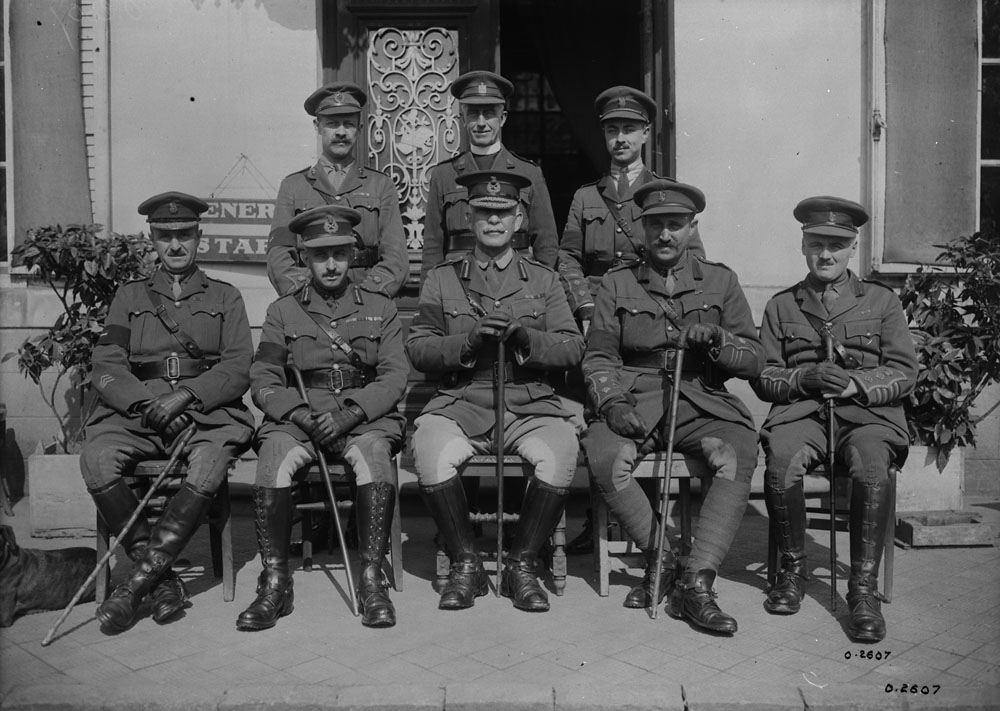
- Major-General A. C. MacDonell and staff officers, 1st Canadian Division, sometime in 1918. (Front row, from left to right): Lieutenant-Colonel J. L. R. Parsons, Brigadier-General H. C. Thacker, Major-General A. C. Macdonnell, Lieutenant-Colonel J. Sutherland Brown, Colonel H. P. Wright. (Back row, from left to right): Lieutenant-Colonel H. F. H. Hertzberg, Hon. Lieutenant-Colonel F. G. Scott, Lieutenant J. M. Macdonnell.
- Born: June 28, 1881; Simcoe, Ontario, Canada
- Died: April 14, 1951 (aged 69); Victoria, British Columbia, Canada
- Military career
- Allegiance: Canada
- Branch: Canadian Militia
- Service years: 1901-1936
- Rank: Brigadier general
- Units: 39th Norfolk Rifles; The Royal Canadian Regiment
- Conflicts: World War I
- Awards: Distinguished Service Order; Companion of the Order of St Michael and St George; Mentioned in dispatches (5)

Brigadier General James "Buster" Sutherland Brown CMG DSO (June 28, 1881 – April 14, 1951) was a Canadian military officer best known for drafting Defence Scheme No. 1, a contingency war plan in 1921 to invade and occupy several American border cities. What is much less well known are Brown's substantial contributions in the area of planning and logistics during his service as a senior staff officer in the Canadian Expeditionary Force (CEF) on the Western Front during the First World War.

== Family background and education ==
Brown was born in Simcoe, Ontario, the eldest son among four children. His father, Frank August Brown, was a successful merchant in agricultural products who had close trading ties with the United States, was active in municipal politics and generally supported the reform policies of the Liberal Party. His grandfather, William Brown, had emigrated to Canada from Northamptonshire in 1842. James, however, became an outspoken Tory supporter of Canada's role within the British Empire and had a deep mistrust of the influence and intentions of the United States towards Canada.

In 1895 at the age of 14, Brown joined the 39th Norfolk Rifles, a local militia regiment, as a boy bugler. When the Anglo-Boer War started in 1899 he was a corporal and wished to join the Canadian Contingent in South Africa, but was persuaded to complete his education as a teacher. He continued his service in the militia after he had begun his career as a teacher, and by February 1901 was gazetted a lieutenant. As a result of further courses as well as training at Royal Military College of Canada in Kingston, Brown qualified as a Permanent Force Officer. In June 1906 he was gazetted as a lieutenant in The Royal Canadian Regiment (The RCR) in the Permanent Force.

James Sutherland Brown and Clare Temple Brown (née Corsan) had three sons. Lieutenant Colonel Malcolm C. Sutherland-Brown, DSO, CD graduated from the Royal Military College of Canada in 1938 and served in the Royal Canadian Engineers overseas. Athol Sutherland-Brown, who was in the Royal Canadian Air Force, wrote ‘Buster Buster: A Canadian Patriot and Imperialist’. Victoria, BC: Trafford Publishing, 2004. A third son Flying Officer Ian Mcdonnell Sutherland-Brown (RMC 1937) graduated from Royal Military College of Canada and was Killed In Action at 21 years of age in Royal Canadian Air Force on August 14, 1941. Ian Sutherland-Brown is commemorated on Page 24 of the Second World War Book of Remembrance.

== Service during the First World War ==
When the British Empire declared war on the Central Powers on August 4, 1914, Brown was a captain in The RCR attending the Staff College in Camberley, England. Twenty days later, he was ordered back to Canada to assist in the massive logistical challenge of organizing, supplying and then transporting to England the 1st Canadian Division of the newly created CEF. On September 25 he was appointed to be Deputy Assistant and Quarter Master General of the Division. The First Contingent of the CEF, comprising over 31,500 men and officers along with guns, vehicles and over 7600 horses, embarked on September 26 for England in a convoy comprising 28 ocean liners that had been located and retained largely by Brown.

Brown served with distinction as a logistics staff officer in the CEF for the duration of the First World War, reaching the rank of temporary lieutenant colonel in May 1916 in The RCR. While attached to the 1st Canadian Division he participated in most of the major Canadian military operations on the Western Front, including the Second Battle of Ypres, the Battle of the Somme, the Battle of Vimy Ridge, Third Battle of Ypres, and the Hundred Days Offensive that ultimately ended the First World War. Serious illness required him to withdraw to England for recuperation during the later half of 1916 and the first months of 1917. His military service continued during the Allied occupation of Germany after the Armistice was signed in November 1918. As a result of his service he was awarded the Distinguished Service Order (14 January 1916), was mentioned in dispatches five times (1 January 1916, 28 May 1917, 18 May 1918, 31 December 1918 and 11 July 1919) and was made a Companion of Order of St Michael and St George (6 March 1918).

== Director of military operations and intelligence ==
After the war, as a lieutenant-colonel, Brown remained a professional officer in the greatly shrunken Canadian Army. In 1920 he was appointed director of military operations and intelligence in Ottawa. In this capacity he was responsible for developing a series of contingency war plans for a variety of possible scenarios. One of those scenarios was the possibility that hostilities might break out between the United States and the British Empire. It was as part of this work that Defence Scheme No. 1 was developed. The plan adopted the strategy that, even in a position of much smaller size versus an adversary, it was best to seize the initiative in order to buy time. A number of armed thrusts across the border to seize strategic cities, followed by a staged withdrawal were envisaged. In the Canadian context it was assumed that the British Empire would rally to the defense of its North American dominion, but that this mobilization would likely require some time to become effective. It then followed that the Canadian Army must do its best to buy time. Defence Scheme No. 1 is actually very close to an earlier plan that Brown developed as part of a planning exercise in 1913.

Defence Scheme No. 1 was abandoned in 1928 by Chief of the General Staff General Andrew McNaughton and most records of it were destroyed. When the existence of the plan was disclosed publicly in the early 1960s, the plan and its author were the subject of considerable ridicule. It is the function of all military planners to consider all possible contingencies, and that the planning process itself serves a useful training function for those involved. Also, the plan was developed at a time when a group of officers, including Sutherland Brown, were lobbying the government for a much larger Permanent Force. The plan may have assumed much larger available forces. However, the political realities in Canada in the early 1920s dashed any possibility of a Canadian army that would be sufficiently large and well equipped to have any realistic hope of succeeding in any surprise pre-emptive assault across the border, no matter how well planned and executed. Brown, as a strong supporter of both Canada and British Empire and as somebody who mistrusted the intentions of the United States, evidently took the plan quite seriously, to the point where he and several of his subordinates risked a diplomatic incident by carrying out reconnaissance trips across the border into New York State and Vermont wearing civilian clothing. Two years after the Canadian plan was rejected, the United States developed War Plan Red, which described an invasion of Canada.

== Service as DOC in British Columbia ==
In July 1928, Brown was made a temporary brigadier on the General List. At the start of the next year he took up his final position, that of district officer commanding, Military District No. 11. This large district covered the province of British Columbia, including the Pacific coastal defense system, and the Yukon Territory. Brown's talents in logistics were applied again in the early 1930s during the Depression, when he was active in setting up and expanding an army-sponsored work camp system for unemployed men in British Columbia. He became increasingly critical of the federal government's response to the plight of the large numbers of unemployed men in British Columbia, whose resource-based economy was especially badly affected by the economic bad times. While Brown was very critical of socialism and organized labor movements, he strongly felt that the authorities in charge had an obligation to provide basic services, including modest cash wages, to the unemployed in a way that matched the seriousness of the situation in the short term while avoiding dependence in the longer term.

== Retirement and service as aide-de-camp ==
Brown retired in Victoria in June 1936 following years of escalating tensions with the national military command in Ottawa, most notably with McNaughton, his First World War colleague and former friend. A formal written offer to serve his country after the outbreak of the Second World War was declined.

In his retirement, Sutherland Brown enjoyed warm relations with the local military establishment and with other veterans of the CEF and, especially, veterans of the RCR. In 1937, he was appointed senior aide-de-camp to the lieutenant governor of British Columbia, and served in that position for three successive representatives of King George VI in British Columbia. An outspoken Conservative, Sutherland Brown secured the nomination of the National Government (Conservative Party) ticket for the riding of Victoria in the federal general election of 1940, but he failed to unseat the popular Liberal Party incumbent Robert Wellington Mayhew.

Sutherland Brown died in Victoria on April 14, 1951, and was buried there with full military honours.
