= Alberta Fish and Game Association =

Conservation charitable organization in Alberta, Canada

- Abbreviation: AFGA
- Formation: 1908
- Type: Charitable organization
- Purpose: Fish and wildlife conservation
- Headquarters: Alberta, Canada
- Members: Over 20,000 members (October 2021)
- Website: www.albertawildlifefederation.ca

The Alberta Fish and Game Association ("AFGA") is a charitable organization dedicated to fish and wildlife conservation in the Canadian province of Alberta. The AFGA was founded in 1908 when a group of anglers and hunters first met in Calgary, Alberta. As of October 20, 2021, the organization has over 20,000 members.

The AFGA is a founding member of a number of sister conservation organizations. In 1962, along with representatives of the 9 other provinces, it helped found the Canadian Wildlife Federation (CWF). At the time it was felt that the organized hunters and anglers of Canada needed a national organization that would represent conservation. Today, it is still only the AFGA and its sister organizations from across Canada that constitute voting members of the CWF, although a significant amount of funds are raised from non-voting members.

In 1997, the AFGA was instrumental in the founding of the Alberta Conservation Association (ACA). The ACA acts as a delegated administration organization at arm's length from government, and administers funds received primarily from the sale of hunting and fishing licenses. At the time, the provincial government was going through a significant reorganization, and $18 million that were in a designated fund for conservation were being threatened to be absorbed by the provincial Treasurer. As a representative of the hunters and anglers who pay into this fund, the AFGA continues to be involved with the ACA.
