= Oliver Milton Martin =

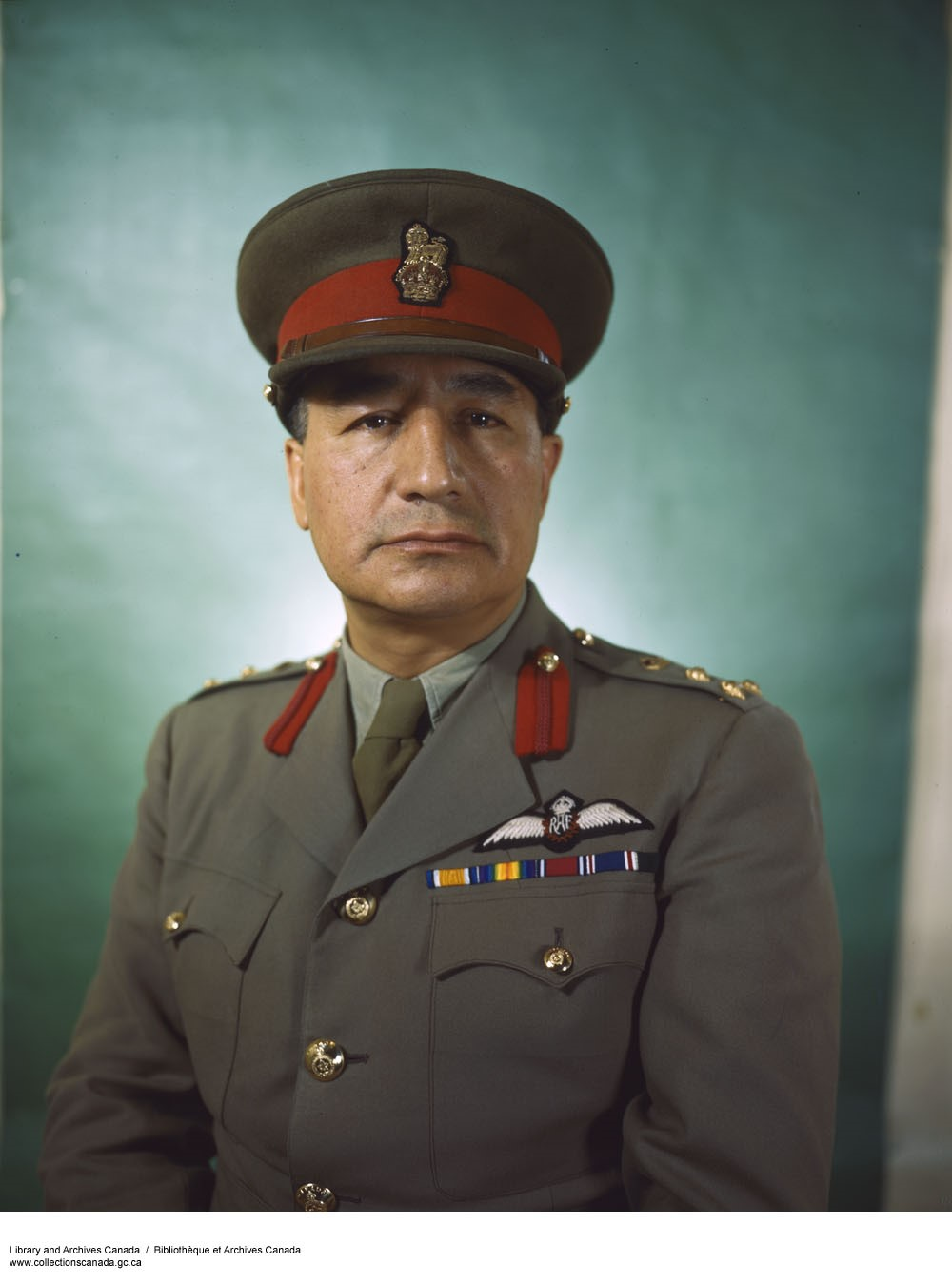
- Born: April 9, 1893; Ohsweken, Ontario
- Died: December 18, 1957 (aged 64)
- Military career
- Allegiance: Canada
- Branch: Canadian Militia; Canadian Expeditionary Force; Royal Flying Corps; Canadian Army
- Rank: Brigadier
- Units: The Haldimand Rifles; 114th Battalion (Haldimand), CEF; 107th Battalion (Winnipeg), CEF; Royal Flying Corps
- Commands: 13th Canadian Infantry Brigade
- Conflicts: First World War: France and Belgium; Second World War
- Awards: Colonial Auxiliary Forces Officers' Decoration; British War Medal; Victory Medal

Oliver Milton Martin VD (1893-1957) was a member of the Kanien'kehá:ka nation from the Six Nations Grand River Reserve, Martin served in the First and Second World Wars, gaining the rank of brigadier and was the highest ranking First Nations person of the Second World War. After leaving the military he was a school teacher, principal and provincial magistrate. Martin was the first Indigenous person to be appointed a provincial magistrate in Ontario. The Royal Canadian Legion Branch #345 in Toronto is named in his honour.

== Personal life ==
Martin was born on April 9, 1893, in Ohsweken, Ontario. Martin was the son of Robert Martin and Lucinda Lucy Miller. He grew up on the Six Nations of the Grand River Reserve. He had four sisters and two brothers.

Martin married Jean "Lillian" Bunt In 1936. Bunt was also a teacher at the Secord School, in East York, Ontario.

== Military career ==
Martin joined The Haldimand Rifles militia regiment in 1909 in the role of bugler. In 1915 he left his teaching post to enlist full-time in the regular force. Two brothers also volunteered. He enlisted with the 114th Overseas Battalion at Cayuga, Ontario, in February 1916. Martin eventually served as a company officer with the 114th and the 107th Battalions. As a lieutenant, he spent seven months in France and Belgium, where he survived a gas attack. In 1917, he qualified as an observer with the Royal Flying Corps and, the following year, he earned his pilot's wings.

During the Second World War he was responsible for training hundreds of men in Canada. Shortly after 1939 Martin was promoted quickly through the officer ranks from colonel to brigadier. He had the command of several forces. From 1940 to 1941 he commanded the 13th Canadian Infantry Brigade at Niagara-on-the-Lake. He later (1941-1942) had charge of the 14th Infantry Brigade in Nanaimo, British Columbia and the 16th Infantry Brigade in Prince George, British Columbia (1942-1943). Martin retired from active service in October 1944.

== Civilian life ==
Martin trained as a teacher at Normal School. During the period between the First and Second World Wars Martin returned to teaching. He taught at the Secord School in East York, Toronto and was later the school principal of Danforth Park School, also in East York.
