= Peter Frederick Haldimand =

Lieutenant Peter Frederick Haldimand (1741 or 1742 – 16 December 1765 off Cape Breton) was a military officer and surveyor in the British Army. He was the son of Abraham Haldimand, brother of Sir Frederick.

Haldimand started his military career while less than 15 years old, sponsored by his uncle, Sir Frederick Haldimand. General James Abercrombie commissioned him as an ensign in the Royal American Regiment. In this capacity, he took part in the Battle of Montreal in 1760. After being promoted to lieutenant, Haldimand was assigned to do surveying and historical work, drawing up maps of Canada and writing histories of Montreal and Trois-Rivières, as well as getting details on their governance.

At the end of the war, Haldimand was charged with assisting Captain Samuel Holland in his survey of the northern district of British North America. Holland praised Haldimand's work, describing him as both an excellent mathematician and astronomer. In 1765, Haldimand was killed when he fell through breaking ice and drowned.
