= 114th Battalion (Haldimand), CEF =

The 114th Battalion (Haldimand), CEF, also known as "Brock's Rangers," was an infantry battalion of the Great War Canadian Expeditionary Force. The 114th Battalion was authorized on 22 December 1915 and embarked for Britain on 31 October 1916 where, on 11 November 1916, its personnel were absorbed by the 35th and 36th Reserve Battalions, CEF, to provide reinforcements for the Canadian Corps in the field. The battalion disbanded on 21 May 1917.

The 114th Battalion advertised itself as "the Indian Unit" during active recruiting and in the media, and several other battalions transferred their Indigenous Canadian recruits to the 114th. (For example, Oliver Milton Martin served in this unit.)

The battalion recruited in Haldimand County and the Six Nations reserve, and was mobilized at Cayuga, Ontario.

The 114th Battalion was commanded by Lt.-Col. A.T. Thompson from 31 October 1916 to 11 November 1916.

The 114th Battalion was awarded the battle honour THE GREAT WAR 1916.

The 114th Battalion (Haldimand), CEF, is perpetuated by the 56th Field Artillery Regiment, RCA.

== Sources ==
- Canadian Expeditionary Force 1914–1919 by Col. G.W.L. Nicholson, CD, Queen's Printer, Ottawa, Ontario, 1962
