= William Merrifield =

Recipient of the Victoria Cross

Sergeant William Merrifield VC MM
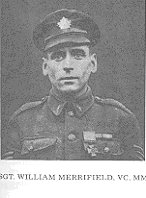
- William Merrifield after being awarded the Victoria Cross.
- Born: 9 October 1890; Brentwood, Essex, England
- Died: 8 August 1943 (aged 52); Toronto, Ontario, Canada
- Burial place: West Korah Cemetery, Sault Ste. Marie, Ontario
- Spouse: Maude Bovington
- Military career
- Allegiance: Canada
- Branch: Canadian Militia: Canadian Expeditionary Force
- Service years: 1914–1919 (CEF)
- Rank: Sergeant
- Units: 97th Regiment; 2nd Battalion (Eastern Ontario Regiment); 1st Canadian Division: 1st Canadian Infantry Brigade; 4th (Central Ontario) Battalion
- Conflicts: First World War: Western Front; Second Battle of Ypres; Battle of Passchendaele; Battle of the Canal du Nord
- Awards: Victoria Cross; Military Medal
- Other work: Fireman on Canadian Pacific Railway

William Merrifield VC, MM (9 October 1890 – 8 August 1943) was an English-Canadian recipient of the Victoria Cross (VC), the highest and most prestigious award for gallantry in the face of the enemy that can be awarded to British and Commonwealth forces. A soldier with Canadian Expeditionary Force during the First World War, he was awarded the VC for his actions on 1 October 1918, during the Battle of the Canal du Nord. Earlier in the war he had been awarded the Military Medal.

== Early life ==
William Merrifield was born at Brentwood, Essex in England on 9 October 1890. When he was 12 years old, he and his uncle emigrated to Canada for employment, settling in Ottawa. He later moved to Sudbury where he worked for the Canadian Pacific Railway before moving to Sault Ste. Marie to work for the Algoma Central Railway as a fireman. He also joined the 97th Regiment, known as the Algonquin Rifles, a unit of Canada's militia.

== First World War ==
On 14 August 1914, shortly after the outbreak of the First World War, Merrifield enlisted at Sault Ste. Marie and was among the first contingent of 129 men to leave the city for the Canadian Expeditionary Force.

In September 1914 he was posted to the 2nd Battalion. He fought at the Second Battle of Ypres in 1915, and two years later was transferred to the CEF's 4th Battalion, part of the 1st Infantry Brigade, 1st Canadian Division. He participated in the Battle of Passchendaele, and for his conduct during the fighting was awarded the Military Medal (MM).

On 1 October 1918, along with the rest of the 1st Division, the 4th Battalion was engaged in the Battle of the Canal du Nord, advancing near Abancourt, north of Cambrai. However, the flanking British division had failed to progress its own front, and the Canadians were exposed to machine-gun fire. Merrifield, now a sergeant and leading a platoon, made a solo foray to deal with two machine-gun posts. Despite being wounded, he was successful in his endeavours and resumed the advance with his platoon. It was not until he was again wounded that he was treated for his wounds. He was awarded the Victoria Cross (VC) for his actions. The VC, instituted in 1856, was the highest award for valour that could be bestowed on a soldier of the British Empire. The citation for his VC read as follows:

For most conspicuous bravery and devotion to duty during the attack near Abancourt on the 1st October, 1918. When his men were held up by an intense fire from two machine-gun emplacements, he attacked them both single-handed. Dashing from shell-hole to shell-hole he killed the occupants of the first post, and, although wounded, continued to attack the second post, and with a bomb killed the occupants. He refused to be evacuated, and led his platoon until again severely wounded. Sjt. Merrifield has served with exceptional distinction on many former occasions, and throughout the action of the 1st October showed the highest qualities of valour and leadership.

— The London Gazette, 4 January 1919

King George V presented Merrifield with a VC on 26 January 1919, in a ceremony at York Cottage in Sandringham. He returned to Canada a few months later and was discharged from the CEF.

Merrifield was given a hero's welcome when he stepped off the train in Sault Ste. Marie on 9 May 1919. He was greeted by a band and a crowd of hundreds who had come to welcome the city's only recipient of the Victoria Cross. This was followed by a procession and two receptions. The local newspaper reported that "he returned the appreciative applause with a soldierly salute" and while he gave some remarks to school children, "like all gallant men he was loath to take much credit to himself."

== Later life ==
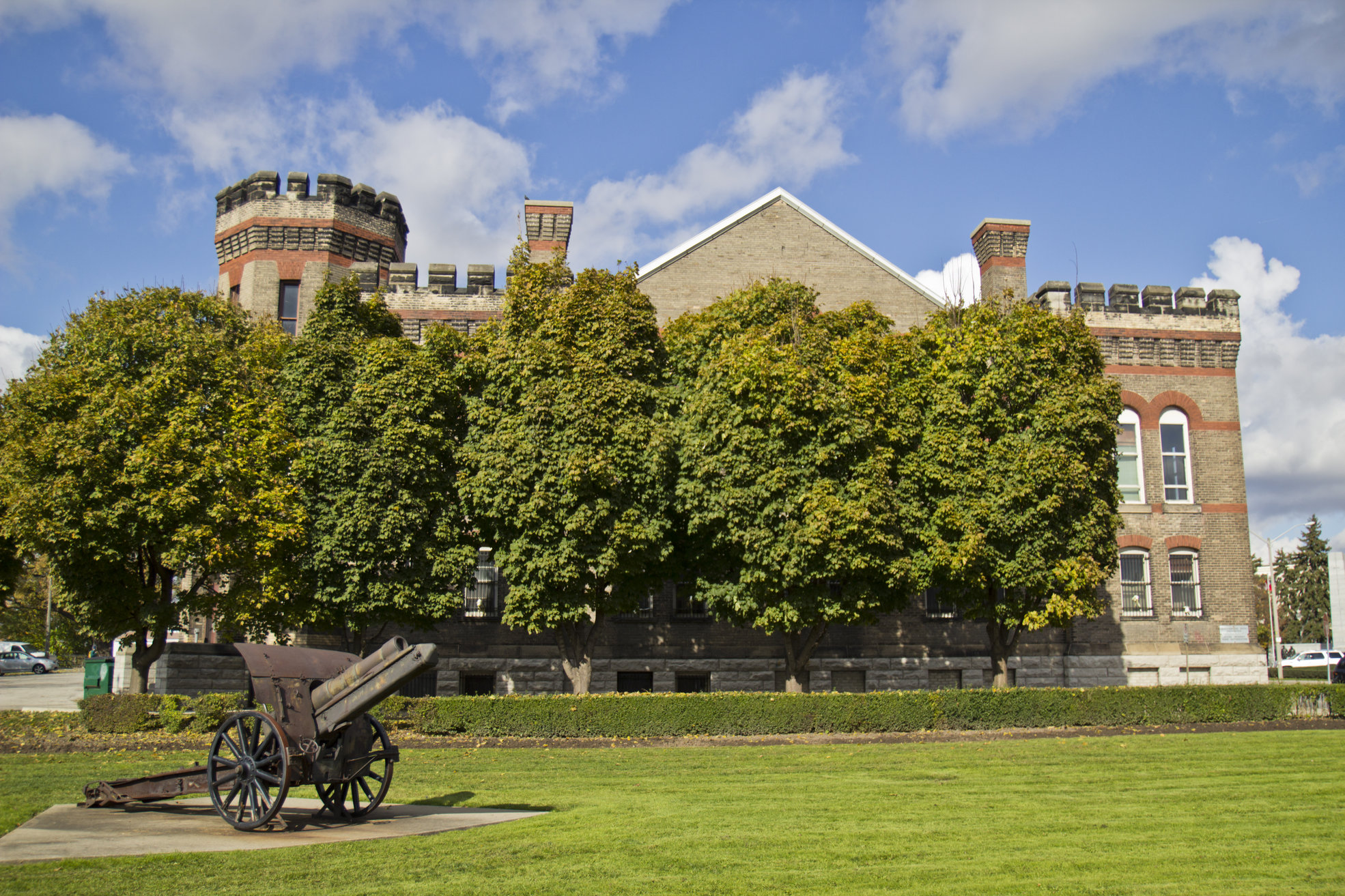
Sergeant William Merrifield Armoury in Brantford, Ontario

Merrifield returned to civilian life resuming his work with the Algoma Central Railway, eventually becoming a locomotive engineer. On 28 June 1921 he married Maude Alexandra Bovington at Sault Ste. Marie's St. John's Church. The couple had four children: William Verne, Curtis, Patricia, and Rosemary.

Merrifield remained in the militia, in which he was a lieutenant. In late 1919, he accompanied the then Prince Edward for part of his royal tour of Canada.

In 1939, Merrifield suffered a stroke resulting in his hospitalization. His health never recovered and he died at Christie Street Hospital in Toronto on 8 August 1943, aged 52.

A funeral was held for him in Sault Ste. Marie on 11 August 1943, attended by the mayor of the city, as well as the president of the local Royal Canadian Legion. Pallbearers included three of the Sault Ste. Marie men who had enlisted with Merrifield in August 1914, as well as three men representing his co-workers in the Brotherhood of Railroaders.

His remains were interred in West Korah Cemetery in Sault Ste. Marie.

== Tributes ==
On the day of his death, Jack McMeeken, the mayor of Sault Ste. Marie told the media "Bill Merrifield was a fine citizen and a man who was well liked by everyone who knew him. He brought great honor to his country, to this city, to his regiment and to himself. His passing is a distinct loss to this city. The people of Canada owe a very great debt to such men as Sgt. Bill Merrifield."

Harry Fee, president of the local Legion branch said "Bill Merrifield fought valoriously on the field of battle; he fought bravely in the game of life during the trying period of reconstruction after the last Great War; he fought nobly in the interests of his comrades who needed help, and finally he fought the ravaging disease which over a period of years threatened to banish that fine spirit which at last went down with colors flying. His fine example will remain long with us and while our loss has been great we are consoled in the fact that he has at last found peace."

In 1946 a public elementary school in Sault Ste. Marie was named after him in recognition of his service to his country. The school was closed in 2015. The armoury of the 56th Field Artillery Regiment in Brantford, Ontario is also named for Merrifield.

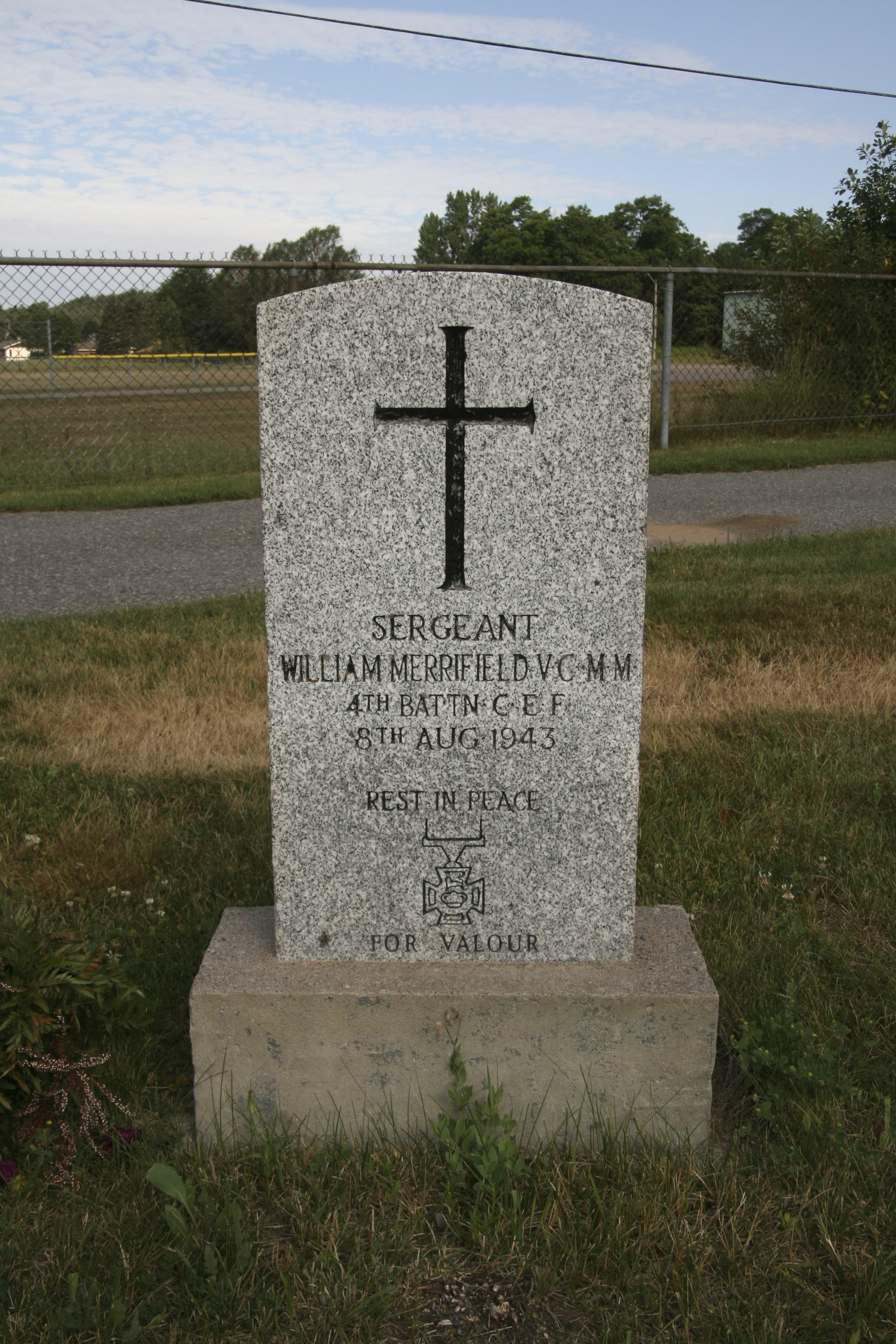
Grave of Canadian Victoria Cross recipient William Merrifield in Sault Ste. Marie, Ontario (Canada)

== Victoria Cross ==
In addition to the VC and MM, Merrifield was also entitled to the 1914–15 Star, the British War Medal, and the Victory Medal. He also held the King George VI Coronation Medal. His medals were donated to the Canadian War Museum by the Merrifield family in November 2005.

== Bibliography ==
- Arthur, Max (2005). Symbol of Courage: The Men Behind the Medal. Chatham, England: Pan Books. ISBN 978-0-330-49133-4.
- Ashcroft, Michael (2007) [2006]. Victoria Cross Heroes. London, United Kingdom: Headline Review. ISBN 978-0-7553-1633-5.
- Gliddon, Gerald (2014) [2000]. The Final Days 1918. VCs of the First World War. Stroud, Gloucestershire: History Press. ISBN 978-0-7509-5368-9.
