= Ferdinand Marani =

Canadian architect (1893–1971)

- Born: 8 August 1893; Vancouver, British Columbia
- Died: 18 July 1971 (aged 77); Toronto, Ontario
- Spouse: Ethel Constance Blake (m. 1918)
- Military career
- Allegiance: Canada
- Branch: Canadian Army; Royal Canadian Air Force
- Service years: 1914–1945
- Rank: Lieutenant Colonel; Group Captain
- Unit: 3rd Battalion (Toronto Regiment), CEF
- Commands: Toronto Regiment (1932–36)
- Conflicts: World War I World War II

Lieutenant Colonel Ferdinand Herbert Marani OBE VD FRAIC RCA (8 August 1893 – 18 July 1971) was a Canadian architect, army officer, and air force officer. Marani began his studies in architecture at the University of Toronto in 1911, but left in 1914 to join the Canadian Army. After serving overseas in World War I, he returned to Toronto and in 1919 began practising architecture. Marani was a partner in several firms throughout his career. His firms excelled in corporate offices for banks and insurance companies, and designed primarily in Neoclassical and Georgian idioms.

Marani was wounded seriously in combat in 1916 and that year returned to Canada. He remained in the army after the war, and from 1932 to 1936 served as the commanding officer of the Toronto Regiment. In 1940 he was transferred to the Royal Canadian Air Force. During World War II he served in Canada as a staff officer and designed special buildings for the air force.

== Biography ==
Ferdinand Herbert Marani was born on 8 August 1893 in Vancouver to Cesare James Marani (1860–1934) and Sarah Beatrice Mason (1871–1963). He had one younger brother, Geoffrey Rutherford Marani (1895–1987). Cesare was an engineer and at one point was an instructor at the University of Toronto school of architecture. Sarah was the daughter of John Herbert Mason (1827–1911), the founder of the Canada Permanent Mortgage Corporation. While Cesare Marani was Italian and Roman Catholic, Ferdinand and Geoffrey were raised Anglican by their English mother.

On 11 July 1918, Marani married Ethel Constance Blake (1896–1979), the granddaughter of Edward Blake. The ceremony was conducted by Henry John Cody at St. Paul's, Bloor Street. They had two children, Elisabeth and Peter (1934–2007). In 1955, Elisabeth married James Bacque, a prominent Toronto author and publisher. Ferdinand Marani died at the Toronto General Hospital on Sunday, 18 July 1971, less than a month short of his 78th birthday. The funeral was held on 21 July at the A. W. Miles Chapel. Marani was interred at Mount Pleasant Cemetery.
