= The Lensbury =

Leisure Club, Conference Hall and Hotel in Teddington, England

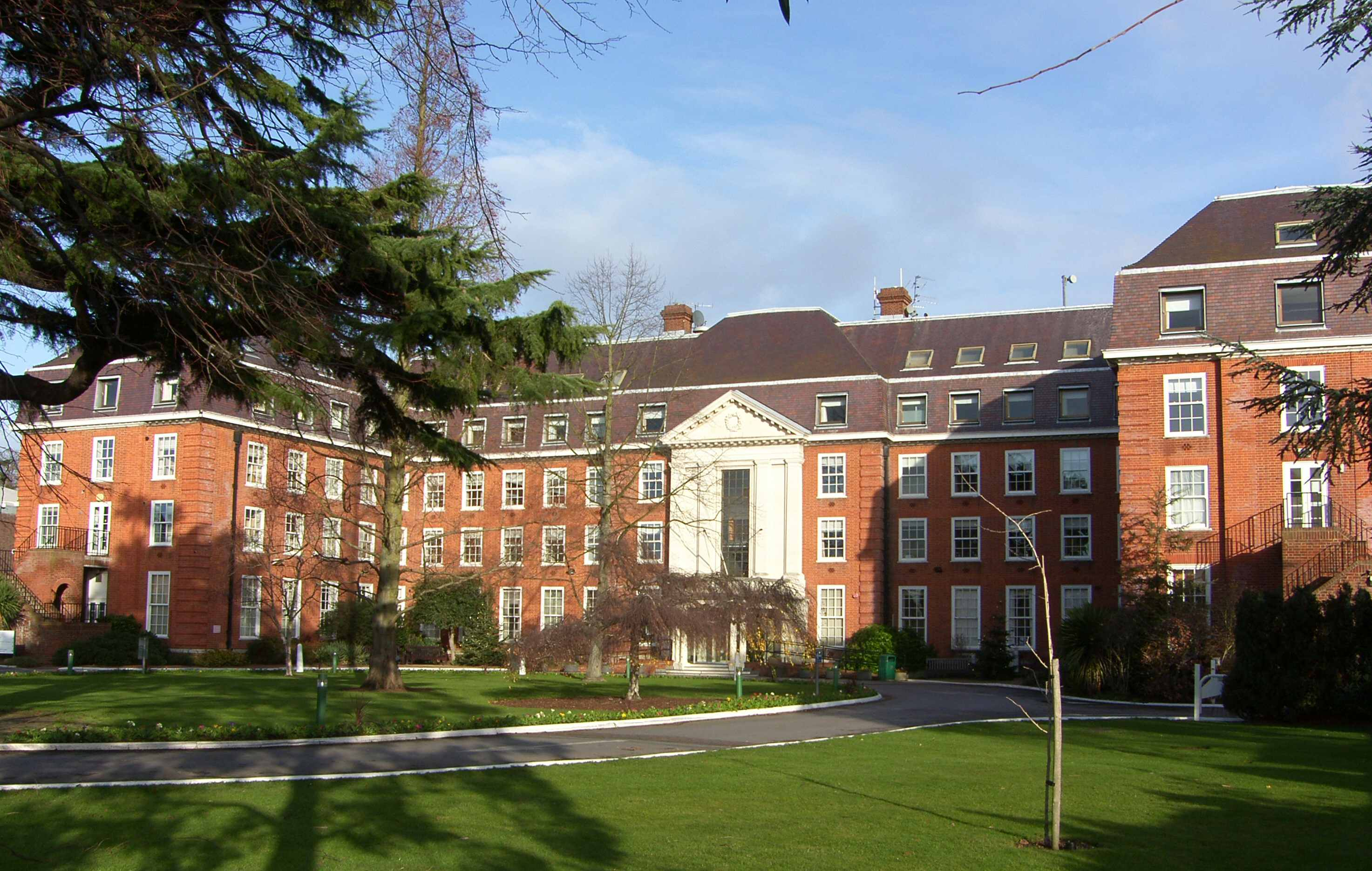
- The Lensbury clubhouse as seen in 2007
- Hotel chain: Iconic Hotels & Resorts

General information
- Type: Hotel, conference centre and leisure club
- Location: Broom Road, Teddington TW11 9NU, United Kingdom
- Coordinates: 51°25′40″N 0°19′07″W
- Owner: Iconic Hotels & Resorts

Technical details
- Grounds: 25 acres (10 ha)

Other information
- Number of rooms: 155

Website
- lensbury.com

The Lensbury is a conference centre, hotel, and leisure facility located on the banks of the Thames in Teddington, in the London Borough of Richmond upon Thames. The Lensbury was founded in 1920, as a club for employees of the oil company Shell and was known as the "Lensbury Club" until the 1990s.

In May 2019, it was sold by Shell to L+R and is part of Iconic Hotels & Resorts.

== History ==
=== Origins ===
The Lensbury Club ("Lensbury Social and Athletic Club") was established in 1920, as a sports club for Shell staff in the United Kingdom – one of the driving forces behind its formation was Dutchman Henri Deterding, one of the original founders of the Royal Dutch/Shell Group of Companies, who was a fitness fanatic. Land was acquired in Broom Road, Teddington, for playing fields and within a year, there were active sections in Cricket, Rugby, Football, Rowing, Ladies Hockey, Tennis and Chess. Between 1920 and the beginning of the Second World War, significant additions to the Lensbury estate were made with property and land purchases on both sides of Broom Road.

In 1933, the club merged with "Britannic House", a similar club operated by BP, and created a joint venture known as the "Lensbury and Britannic House Associated Clubs" – an arrangement that lasted for 30 years. In 1938, a new clubhouse was opened which comprised 162 bedrooms, a dining room, a ballroom and many other facilities. During the war years, club activities were suspended and Lensbury became a Shell office and some of the sports grounds were ploughed up to grow vegetables.

=== Postwar years ===
In the immediate postwar years, it took time for the Lensbury clubhouse to be free of its wartime role as a Shell office but by the early 1950s, most of the established activities, and many new ones, were in full swing again. By 1956, membership had reached 5,000 and there were 27 active sections. The arrangements with BP came to an end in 1962, and Lensbury became once again a facility exclusively for Shell employees (and those of the UK marketing joint venture Shell-Mex and BP Ltd). Many new sports and pastimes were introduced, including sailing, judo, ballroom dancing, and keep-it, and membership continued to rise, reaching 7,000 by 1964.

Building of additional facilities for training courses took place in 1967 and the role of the Lensbury clubhouse as both a recreational and a training location was established. However, financial concerns began to be expressed in the difficult economic climate of the late 1960s and early 1970s and the club's structure changed so that it became a "members" club to be governed by members committees and supervised by trustees. However, Shell still saw the club unequivocally as a benefit for employees, and the Lensbury continued to receive a subsidy from Shell to help cover its costs. The club became, as a consequence, more arm's-length from Shell with the intention that Shell's subsidy would gradually reduce.

=== 1970s and after ===
In the 1970s, Lensbury had active sections in 47 sports and pastimes including tennis, hockey, volleyball, bowls, music, drama (Lensbury Theatre Group, bridge, sailing, swimming, motor cruising, sub-aqua, mountaineering (now the LMC Mountaineering Club), fishing, as well as its core rowing, association football, cricket and rugby football teams. At this time, membership was restricted to employees of Shell companies in the UK, although this restriction was relaxed for some of the team sports participants.

The clubhouse was badly damaged by a fire in April 1976; rebuilding was completed in 1977. In the process, an extra floor was added to expand the number of guest rooms.

=== Yarranton years ===
Sir Peter Yarranton, former Lensbury's general manager

In 1978, Shell appointed Peter Yarranton as Lensbury's general manager. Yarranton was himself an accomplished sportsman, notably in rugby in which sport he had been capped five times by England. An indoor swimming pool was opened in the same year, and under Yarranton's management, the club's status as a world class sporting venue was enhanced. Membership reached 13,000 and many international sporting stars were attracted to use the club's facilities, including top tennis players such as Steffi Graf, Chris Evert and John Lloyd, during Wimbledon. Prince Philip, Duke of Edinburgh visited the club in 1980. Middlesex County Cricket Club used the ground for some Second XI matches – a recognition of the quality of the club's main cricket square, the home of Lensbury Cricket Club.

From 1978, until Peter Yarranton's retirement in 1993, Lensbury continued to build on its tradition as primarily a club for team and individual sports. Yarranton became President of the Rugby Football Union in 1991, and Chairman of the UK Sports Council in 1989, and thus he combined his management of Lensbury with sports representation at the very highest level. It was with some pride that he described the club in 1990 as "… the largest sports, leisure, social and training centre in Europe and certainly one of the largest in the world".

=== 1992 to 2008 ===
In the 1990s, Shell decided that Lensbury should be seen not as exclusively a "staff benefit" but as a "profit centre". Driven by the Shell Group's new chairman J.S. Jennings, and implemented by the new Chairman of the Club, Clive Mather, changes were instituted that were designed first to reduce and then to eliminate Shell's subsidy. This meant that the decision that had been taken in 1974 to make Lensbury a members club without direct Shell involvement was reversed, and all the members committees were abolished. The club became a subsidiary, like any of Shell's other assets, and like them, it was defined as a business whose goal was to maximise its profits. A plan was proposed by members that would have achieved this objective whilst retaining the essential character of the club, including all the team sports, but this was rejected by the Shell directors. Instead, they insisted on drastic changes to the club.

Non-Shell employees were sought, members' subscriptions were substantially increased, and the whole basis of the club went through a radical series of changes. Team sports, the life blood of the club since its creation, were gradually phased out, and a greatly expanded gymnasium/fitness centre was introduced. The extensive playing fields on the opposite side of Broom Road to the clubhouse were disposed of, and the cricket and rugby pitches on the clubhouse side were redeveloped as a pitch and putt par 3 golf course. The bowling green was closed. These changes had been initially fought hard by many of Lensbury's traditional members (particularly those in the Cricket, Rugby, Bowls and other long-established sections which were forced to disband) but to no avail.

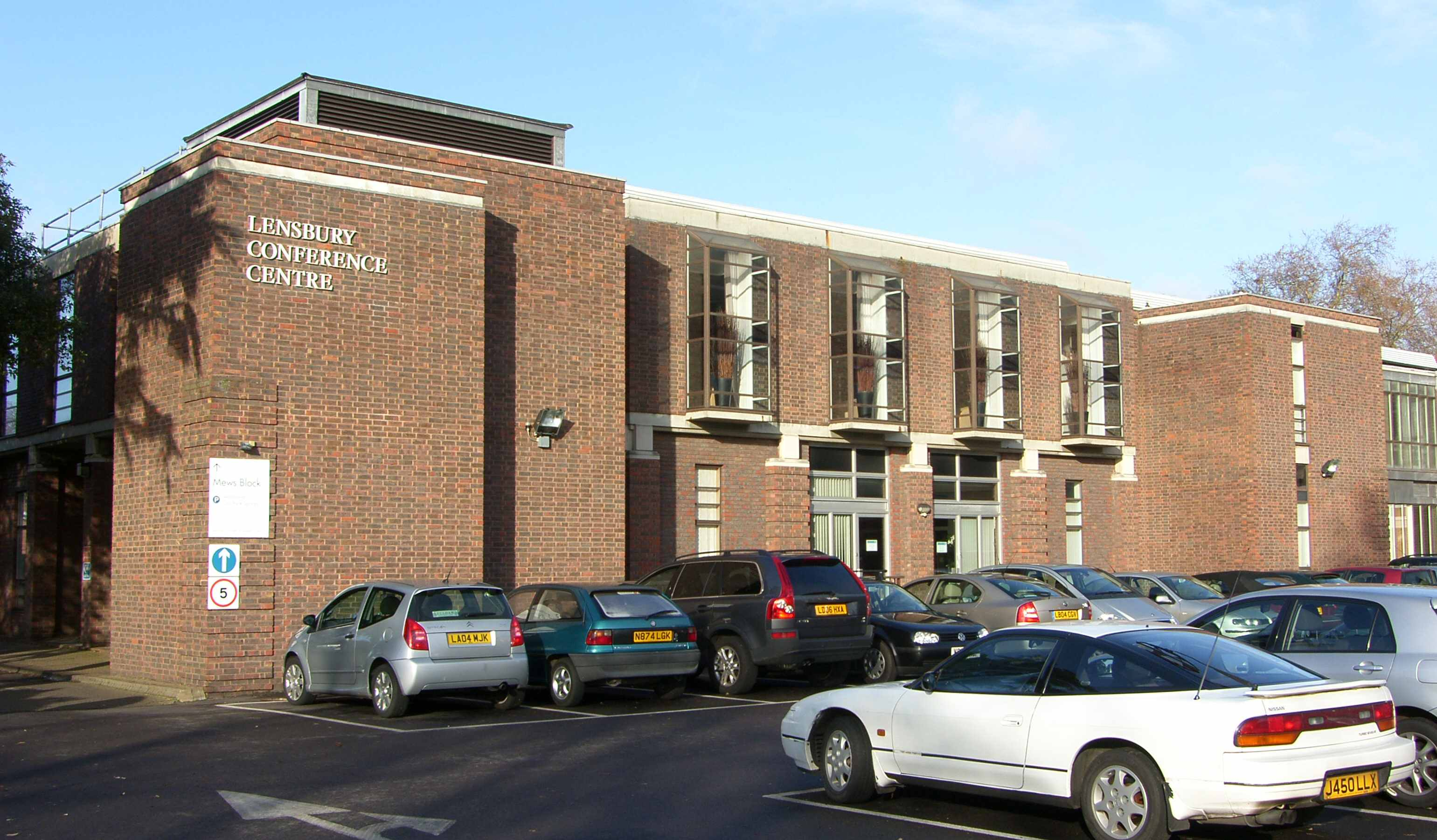
The Lensbury conference and training centre is attached to the 1938 clubhouse

The target market for the club changed from all Shell employees of whatever background (facilitated by nominal subscriptions) to focus on the more wealthy middle-class in the area – particularly professional couples with young families – mostly with no connections with Shell. A crèche facility was introduced. These changes were overseen by a new Chief executive, Lesley White, a professional club/catering manager with no Shell connections or loyalties.

Lensbury hosted Middlesex County Cricket Club and the county played second XI matches on Lensbury's cricket pitch, between 1982 and 1998. Phil Tufnell, Chris Cowdrey, Mark Ramprakash, Angus Fraser, Chris Lewis and Andrew Strauss were amongst the future England international cricketers to have played at the ground. In 2008, the Lensbury celebrated Children in Need, Genes for Jeans and Link Poverty Family Shoebox Appeal, and in 2009, it acquired a Cyber coach.

== Name and logo ==
The name Lensbury was coined in 1920 from part of the names of Shell's two London offices at the time which were located at St Helens Court, in Bishopsgate and at 16, Finsbury Circus, also in the City of London. The name took the "Lens" from "Helens" and the "bury" from "Finsbury". For most of its existence, Lensbury had a logo which reflected its Shell ownership and essential purpose as a benefit for Shell employees. When this purpose was changed in the 1990s, the logo was also changed and today, there is little or no overt sign of Shell's ownership at the clubhouse. "The" was added to the title. The present day hotel and conference facility is now called The Lensbury.

"The Lensbury" is a name sometimes also given to the Bridges Handicap Race, a traditional running race which starts and finishes on the Albert Embankment, near to Shell Centre in London.

In 2002, Shell/Lensbury proceeded with a civil lawsuit against former Lensbury team sport players who had sought to retain the Lensbury name for (e.g.) their rugby team. Shell/Lensbury won the case on trademark grounds. After losing the rights to continued use of the "Lensbury" name, Lensbury Rugby Football Club renamed themselves "LockSide RFC".

== Facilities ==
As of 2020, The Lensbury has 155 rooms and a sports complex that includes a full-sized rugby pitch. Its Terrace Conservatory overlooks the hotel's grounds on the Northern bank of the Thames. Its restaurants include the Thames View Restaurant and the more formal Dunbar Restaurant.
