= Shell Canada =

Canadian regional subsidiary of Shell plc

Shell Canada Limited
- Type: Subsidiary
- Industry: Oil and gas
- Founded: 1911; 115 years ago
- Headquarters: Montreal (1911–1958); Toronto (1958–1984); Calgary (1984-present)
- Key people: Stastia West (president and Country chair)
- Products: Petroleum; Petrochemical products
- Revenue: ▲CA$14.394 billion (2013)
- Parent: Shell plc
- Subsidiaries: ARC Resources
- Website: shell.ca

Shell Canada Limited (French: Shell Canada Limitée) is the principal Canadian subsidiary of British energy major Shell plc and one of Canada's largest integrated oil companies. Exploration and production of oil, natural gas and sulphur is a major part of its business, as well as the marketing of gasoline and related products through the company's approximately 1,800 stations across Canada.

After a global reorganization by the European parent, Shell's North American operations are controlled by Shell Energy North America, which is headquartered in Houston, Texas. Shell Energy North America's Canadian operational unit, Shell Canada, maintains a regional corporate office in Calgary, Alberta. Shell Canada also maintains a major office in Toronto, Ontario.

== History ==
Shell Canada's shares were originally independently traded on the Toronto Stock Exchange. The company was 78% owned by Royal Dutch Shell which in 2006 launched an $8.7-billion takeover of the 22% of Shell Canada that it didn't own. In March 2007 the shareholders of Shell Canada Ltd. accepted a $45.00 per share cash offer from Royal Dutch Shell plc. This acquisition was primarily driven by the desire of the parent company to take total control of its Canadian division's unconventional resources, specifically the oil sands. The move was unanimously approved by the independent members of the board of directors.

In 2003, Royal Dutch Shell had appointed a British executive, and former chairman of Shell in the UK, Clive Mather, as president and CEO of Shell Canada.

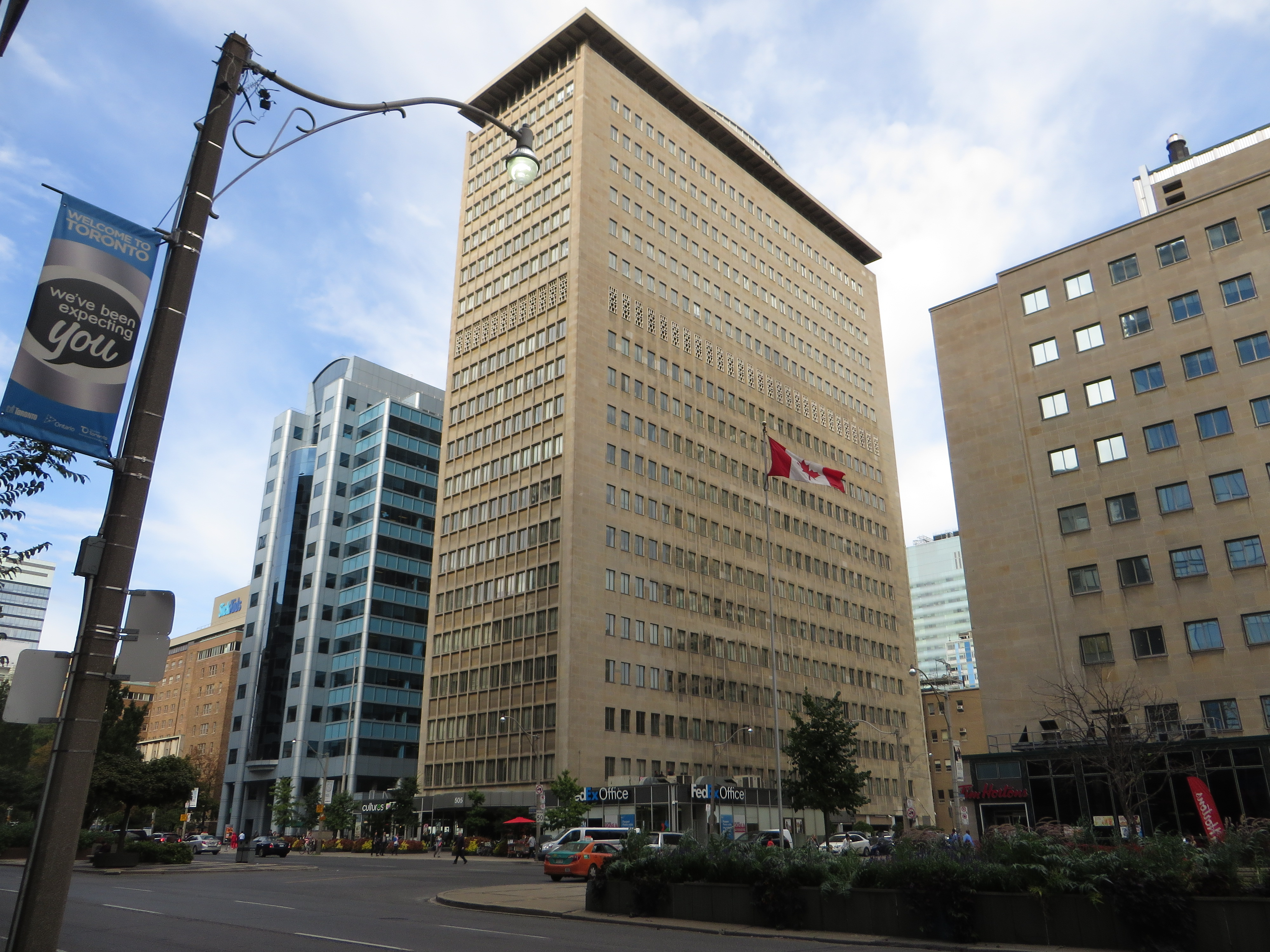
The Shell Building at 505 University Avenue in Toronto was the company's headquarters from 1958 to 1984. It was designed by Marani & Morris.

As a consequence of the stock acquisition by Royal Dutch Shell, all Shell Canada executives holding stock options benefitted. Shell Canada announced on Mather's retirement from the company shortly after the acquisition was completed that his total pay package for his final year (2006–2007) was $4.9 million including bonuses, stock options and pension contributions and that on leaving the company, Mather was additionally eligible for a lump sum payment equal to his annual gross salary. His total benefit in that year was, therefore $9.8 million of which some $5 million was from exercised stock options, making him one of the highest remunerated employees in Royal Dutch Shell.

In 2006, Shell Canada acquired the oil sands developer BlackRock Ventures Inc. for $2.4 billion. As part of this deal, Shell acquired the Orion oil-sands project near Cold Lake, Alberta. In May 2012, Shell announced that it has put the project up for sale.

In 2007, the company invested $20 million into an expansion at the Brockville Lubricant Plant. In January 2019, it announced plans to invest a further $16 million towards new equipment that will increase production and efficiency.

In November 2015, the Shell Canada Quest Energy project began commercial operations. Part of the Athabasca Oil Sands Project, it involves Shell as the major shareholder (60%), Chevron Canada Limited (20%), and Marathon Canadian Oil Sands Holding Limited (20%). It is identified as being the first commercial-scale CCS project, proposing to reduce CO_{2} emissions in Canada by 1 million tonnes per year.

In April 2017, the company completed an expansion project at the Scotford refinery, growing hydrocracker production by 20%.

In September 2026, the company assumed ownership of ARC Resources as a part of Shell's $22 billion acquisition of the company. This expanded Shell Canada's presence in Canada's Montney Formation and added approximately 370,000 barrels of oil equivalent per day of production to its portfolio.

== Management and employees ==
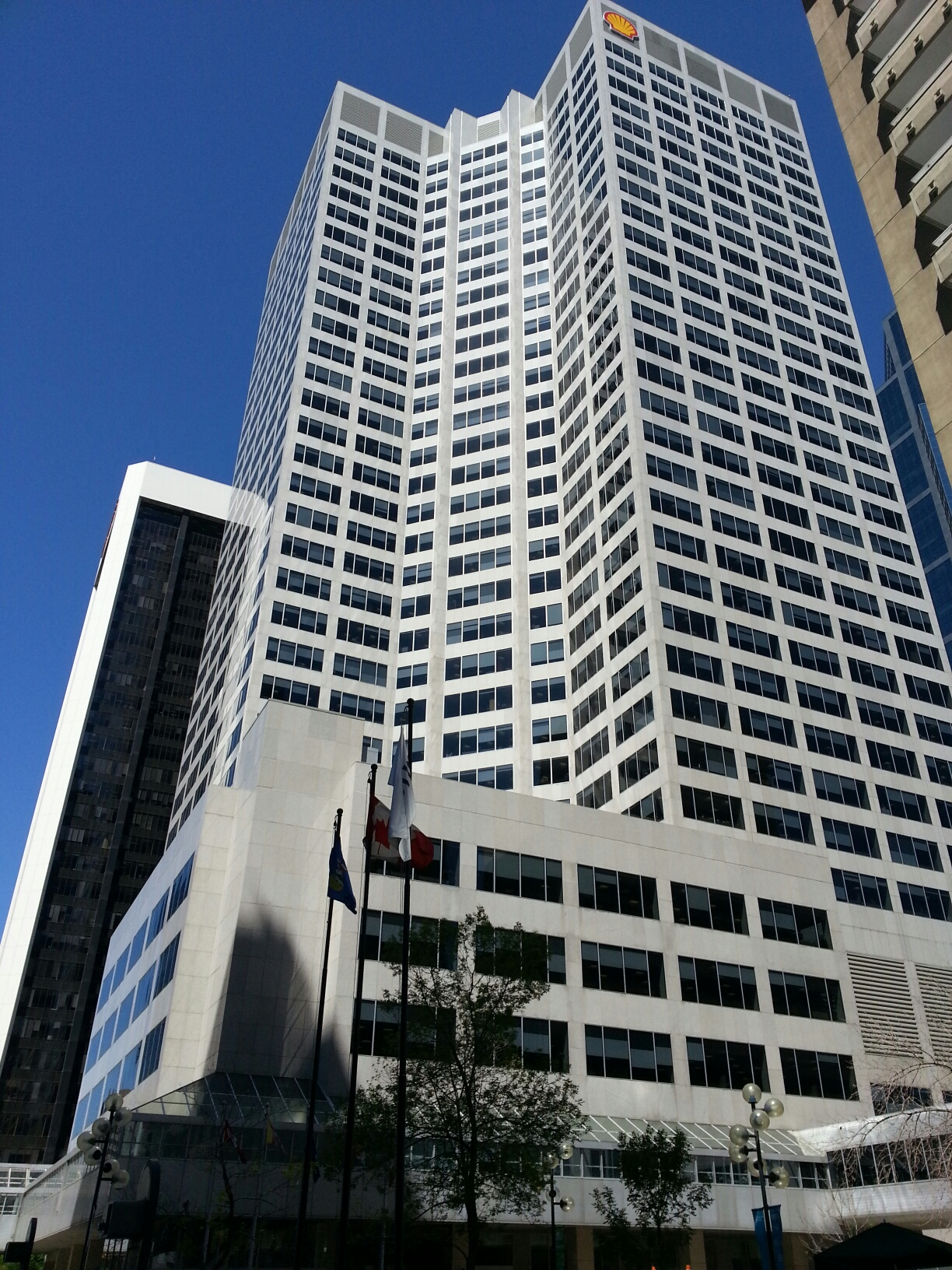
In 1984, Shell Canada relocated its headquarters to the Shell Centre in Calgary. The company vacated the building in 2023 and moved to The Bow.

The current Shell Canada directors are Susannah Pierce (President and Country Chair), Leanne Gawley (Vice President and Controller), Andrew Harris (Vice President), Barry Tyndall (Vice President, General Counsel and Assistant Secretary) and Zoe Yujnovich (Executive Vice President).

In October 2008, Shell Canada Limited was named one of "Canada's Top 100 Employers" by Mediacorp Canada Inc., and was featured in Maclean's news magazine. Later that month, Shell Canada was also named one of Alberta's Top Employers, which was announced by the Calgary Herald and the Edmonton Journal.

== Refineries ==
- Scotford Upgrader and Refinery: 100,000 bbl/d (16,000 m^{3}/d)
- Corunna Refinery: 85,000 bbl/d (13,500 m^{3}/d)
- Montreal East Refinery: 161,000 bbl/d (25,600 m^{3}/d); closed in 2010

== Leadership ==
=== President ===
1. Patrick M. Fowlie, 1929–1948
2. William M. V. Ash, 1948–1961
3. Paul L. Kartzke, 1962–1968
4. Harold Bridges, 1968–1970
5. John F. Bookout, 1970–1974
6. C. William Daniel, 1974–1985
7. John M. MacLeod, 1985–1993
8. Charles W. Wilson, 1993–1999
9. Timothy W. Faithfull, 1999–2003
10. Linda Cook, 2003–2004
11. H. Clive Mather, 2004–2007
12. W. Adrian Loader, 2007
13. David R. Collyer, 2008–2009
14. Lorraine Mitchelmore, 2009–2015
15. Michael Crothers, 2016–2021
16. Susannah Pierce, 2021–2025
17. Statia West, 2025–

== See also ==
- Canadian Environment Awards
