= Royal Grenadiers =

The Royal Grenadiers
- Active: 1862–1936
- Country: Canada
- Branch: Canadian Militia
- Type: Grenadiers
- Role: Infantry
- Part of: Non-Permanent Active Militia
- Garrison/HQ: Toronto, Ontario
- Nickname: The 10th Grenadiers
- Motto: "Ready Aye Ready"
- March: Quick: "The British Grenadiers"
- Engagements: Fenian Raids; North-West Rebellion; Second Boer War; First World War
- Battle honours: See #Battle honours

The Royal Grenadiers was an infantry regiment of the Non-Permanent Active Militia of the Canadian Militia (now the Canadian Army). The regiment was distinctive as it was one of only two regiments in the Canadian Army to be designated as a grenadier regiment (the other unit being The Winnipeg Grenadiers). In 1936, the regiment was amalgamated with The Toronto Regiment to form The Royal Regiment of Toronto Grenadiers (now The Royal Regiment of Canada).

== Lineage ==
=== The Royal Grenadiers ===
- Originated on 14 March 1862, in Toronto as The 10th Battalion Volunteer Militia Rifles, Canada.
- Redesignated on 21 November 1862, as The 10th Battalion Volunteer Militia (Infantry), Canada.
- Redesignated on 10 April 1863, as the 10th or "Royal Regiment of Toronto Volunteers"'.
- Redesignated on 5 August 1881, as the 10th Battalion, Royal Grenadiers.
- Redesignated on 8 May 1900, as the 10th Regiment, Royal Grenadiers.
- Redesignated on 1 May 1920, as The Royal Grenadiers.
- Amalgamated on 15 December 1936, with The Toronto Regiment and redesignated as The Royal Regiment of Toronto Grenadiers (now The Royal Regiment of Canada).

== Perpetuations ==
- 58th Battalion, CEF
- 123rd Battalion (Royal Grenadiers), CEF

== History ==
=== Early history ===
On 14 March 1862, the 10th Battalion Volunteer Militia Rifles, Canada was authorized for service in Toronto, Canada West (now Ontario) with its headquarters and line companies in Toronto. As in common with most Canadian Militia infantry regiments being raised at the time, they were a rifle regiment. However around the same time of the regiments founding, the members of the unit requested to the militia department that they be organized and uniformed as a line infantry unit instead. As a result on 21 November 1862, the regiment was redesignated as the 10th Battalion Volunteer Militia (Infantry) Canada and again on 10 April 1863, as the 10th or Royal Regiment of Toronto Volunteers.

=== Fenian Raids ===
The 10th or Royal Regiment of Toronto Volunteers was called out on active service from 8 to 31 March and from 1 to 22 June 1866 to defend Canada from Fenian raiders. The battalion served on the Niagara frontier and took part in the mopping-up operations after the disastrous Battle of Ridgeway.

=== 1880s ===
On 5 August 1881, the regiment was redesignated as the 10th Battalion Royal Grenadiers. At the time, this unit was the only other regiment of its type in the entire British Empire: the other regiment being The Grenadier Guards.

=== North-West Rebellion ===
On 27 March 1885, the 10th Battalion Royal Grenadiers was called to arms and turned out in marching order the following day. The battalion served with General Middleton's column of the North West Field Force, until they returned from active service on 24 July 1885. The 10th Royal Grenadiers saw action at the Battle of Fish Creek (24 April), and the Battle of Batoche (9–12 May), serving with distinction during the campaign and earning the regiment its first battle honours.

=== South African War and early 1900s ===
During the Second Boer War, the 10th Battalion Royal Grenadiers contributed volunteers for the 2nd (Special Service) Battalion, The Royal Canadian Regiment of Infantry.

As a part of the country-wide reorganization of the Canadian Militia at the start of the 20th century, on 8 May 1900, the regiment was redesignated as the 10th Regiment, Royal Grenadiers.

=== Great War ===
On 6 August 1914, details of the 10th Royal Grenadiers were placed on active service for local protection duties.

When the Canadian Expeditionary Force was raised, the 10th Royal Grenadiers contributed drafts to help raise the 3rd Battalion (Toronto Regiment), CEF alongside those from The Queen's Own Rifles of Canada and The Governor General's Body Guard.

On 20 April 1915, the 58th Battalion, CEF, was authorized for service and on 22 November 1915, the battalion embarked for Great Britain. After its arrival in Europe, on 22 February 1916, the 58th Battalion disembarked in France, where it fought as part of the 9th Canadian Brigade, 3rd Canadian Division, in France and Flanders until the end of the war. On 15 September 1920, the 58th Battalion, CEF was disbanded.

On 22 December 1915, the 123rd Battalion (Royal Grenadiers), CEF was authorized for service and from 7 to 8 August 1916, the battalion embarked for Great Britain. On 17 January 1917, the battalion was converted to a pioneer battalion and redesignated as the 123rd Canadian Pioneer Battalion, Royal Grenadiers, CEF. On 10 March 1917, the battalion disembarked in France where it served as the pioneer battalion of the 3rd Canadian Division in France and Flanders. On 25 May 1918, the battalion was reorganized to form three new engineering battalions; the 7th, 8th and 9th Canadian Engineer Battalions, CEF. On 15 September 1920, the 123rd Battalion, CEF was disbanded.

=== 1920s–1930s ===
On 15 March 1920, as a result of the Otter Commission and the following post-war reorganization of the militia, the 10th Regiment Royal Grenadiers was redesignated as The Royal Grenadiers and was reorganized with two battalions (one of them a paper-only reserve battalion) to perpetuate the assigned war-raised battalions of the Canadian Expeditionary Force.

As a result of the 1936 Canadian Militia reorganization, on 15 December 1936, The Royal Grenadiers was amalgamated with The Toronto Regiment to form The Royal Regiment of Toronto Grenadiers (now The Royal Regiment of Canada).

== Organization ==
=== The 10th Battalion Volunteer Militia Rifles, Canada (14 March 1862) ===
- Regimental Headquarters (Toronto)
- No. 1 Company (Toronto)
- No. 2 Company (Toronto)
- No. 3 Company (Toronto)
- No. 4 Company (Toronto)
- No. 5 Company (Toronto)
- No. 6 Company (Toronto)
- No. 7 Company (Toronto)

=== 10th Regiment Royal Grenadiers (5 June 1915) ===
- Regimental Headquarters (Toronto)
- A Company (Toronto)
- B Company (Toronto)
- C Company (Toronto)
- D Company (Toronto)

=== The Royal Grenadiers (21 February 1921) ===
- 1st Battalion (perpetuating the 58th Battalion, CEF)
- 2nd (Reserve) Battalion (perpetuating the 123rd Battalion, CEF)

== Alliances ==
- United Kingdom - Prince of Wales's Leinster Regiment (Royal Canadians) (Until 1922)

== Uniform ==
=== Line infantry ===
When the 10th Regiment was first raised, it was first intended for it to be organized as a rifle regiment wearing the rifleman’s green uniform similar to that of the King's Royal Rifle Corps, the Rifle Brigade (The Prince Consort's Own) or that of the 2nd Queen’s Own Rifles.

However, the new battalion was instead designated as a regiment of infantry. As such, the 10th Royals wore the scarlet uniform of the line infantry. The uniform of the 10th Royals consisted of a scarlet infantry-pattern tunic with dark (royal blue) blue facings and dark blue trousers with a red stripe. The officer’s uniform was of a similar pattern but from better quality materials. For an undress uniform, officers of the 10th Royals wore a dark blue patrol jacket.

The regimental headdress consisted of the 1861 pattern "French" shako with a regimental plate on the front and a white-over-red ball tuft. The shako was later replaced in 1879 by the blue home service helmet and later the white Canadian-pattern service helmet. The undress headdress for other ranks and NCO’s consisted of the dark-blue Kilmarnock cap with brass numerals indicating the regimental number. For the officers, they instead wore a peaked forage cap.

=== Grenadiers ===
When the battalion was redesignated as a regiment of grenadiers in 1881, the 10th Grenadiers adopted a full dress uniform similar to that of the Brigade of Guards in London and the Governor General's Foot Guards in Ottawa. This uniform consisted of the grenadier-pattern tunic with royal blue facings worn by the Foot Guards in London and the Governor General’s Foot Guards but with their regimental tunic having its buttons in singles similar to that of the Grenadier Guards (unlike the Governor General’s Foot Guards which have their buttons in pairs similar to that of the Coldstream Guards).

Though redesignated as grenadiers in 1881, the regiment continued to wear the Canadian-pattern service helmet until the early 1890s, when they finally changed to the grenadier bearskin cap for full dress. When it was adopted, it was worn with a white plume (later changed to a red-over white plume).

After The Royal Grenadiers were amalgamated with The Toronto Regiment in 1936 and became The Royal Regiment of Canada, the grenadier pattern uniform became the regiment’s full dress uniform and is still used today by the regiment for ceremonial occasions.

== Battle honours ==
=== North-West Rebellion ===
- Fish Creek
- Batoche
- North West Canada, 1885

=== South African War ===
- South Africa, 1899–1900

=== Great War ===
- Ypres, 1915, '17
- Festubert, 1915
- Mount Sorrel
- Somme, 1916, '18
- Flers-Courcelette
- Ancre Heights
- Arras, 1917
- Vimy, 1917
- Arleux
- Scarpe, 1917, '18
- Hill 70
- Passchendaele
- Amiens
- Drocourt-Quéant
- Hindenburg Line
- Canal du Nord
- Cambrai, 1918
- Pursuit to Mons
- France and Flanders, 1915–18

== Notable members ==
- Brigadier General James Mason
- Lieutenant-Colonel H. J. Grasett CMG
- Captain Sandford Fleming, commanded No.3 Company from January 1862 until January 1865.
- Surgeon-Lieutenant-Colonel George Ryerson
