= Pemex Deer Park =

Oil refinery in Deer Park, Texas, US

- Location of the Deer Park Refinery in Texas
- Location: Deer Park, Texas, United States; 29.7196°N 95.1320°W

Refinery details
- Owner: Pemex
- Opened: 1929
- Capacity: 275,000 barrels per day (43,700 m^{3}/d)
- Website: www.pemex.com/en

Pemex Deer Park is an oil refinery located in Deer Park, Texas on the Houston Ship Channel in the Greater Houston area. It is owned and operated by Pemex.

As of December 2017, the plant is the fourth-largest taxpayer and the tenth largest employer in Harris County.

The refinery has a 275,000 bbl/d (43,700 m^{3}/d) crude processing capacity, making it the 18th largest in the US, as of January 2019, with a facility that includes crude & vacuum distillation, delayed coker, fluid catalytic cracker, hydrocracker, polymerization, and alkylation units. Secondary processing units make the refinery's capacity 340,000 bbl/d (54,000 m^{3}/d).

Construction of the Deer Park refinery began in 1929, on an 800-acre site, and has expanded several times over the years. Construction of the petrochemical facilities began in 1940. Before Shell sold Deer Park to Pemex, the facility encompassed 2,300 acres and employed 1,500 Shell employees, and 1,200 contract employees of several subcontractors.

Dating to 1929, it was operated from 1993 to 2022 as a 50-50 joint venture between Shell US and Pemex. On May 24, 2021, Pemex and Shell reached an agreement for the sale of Shell's interest in Deer Park Refining Limited Partnership, transferring full ownership of the refinery to Pemex, subject to regulatory approval. On January 20, 2022, Shell completed sale of their interest in the Deer Park refinery to Pemex.
