= John Frank Bookout Jr. =

American businessman

John Frank Bookout, Jr. (born December 31, 1922 Shreveport, Louisiana), an oil industry executive, was nominated to be the American Ambassador to Saudi Arabia on June 3, 1992. At the time of his nomination, Bookout was supervisory director of Royal Dutch Shell in The Hague, Netherlands. He was president and chief executive officer of Shell Oil Company in Houston, Texas (1976 to 1988). From 1950 to 1976, other positions included executive vice president for exploration and production in Houston, TX; president of Shell Canada, Ltd. in Toronto, Canada; and as vice president of New Orleans exploration and production.

On October 8, 1992, his nomination was returned to the President under the provisions of Senate Rule XXXI, paragraph 6 of the Standing Rules of the Senate. That rule states:

Nominations neither confirmed nor rejected during the session at which they are made shall not be acted upon at any succeeding session without being again made to the Senate by the President; and if the Senate shall adjourn or take a recess for more than thirty days, all nominations pending and not finally acted upon at the time of taking such adjournment or recess shall be returned by the Secretary to the President, and shall not again be considered unless they shall again be made to the Senate by the President.

Bookout graduated from the University of Texas at Austin (B.S. and M.A., 1950).

== Business career ==
When he announced his retirement as President and CEO, effective June 30, 1988, it was signaled as possibly the end of an era.
