= ARC Resources =

Canadian energy company

ARC Resources Ltd.
- Type: Subsidiary
- Industry: Oil and gas
- Founded: 1996; 30 years ago
- Headquarters: Calgary, Alberta, Canada
- Key people: Terry Anderson (CEO); Kris Bibby (SVP & CFO)
- Products: Petroleum; Natural gas Natural gas liquids
- Production output: 374,336 barrels of oil equivalent (2,290,140 GJ) per day (2025)
- Revenue: ▲CA$6.076 billion (2025)
- Net income: ▲CA$1.275 billion (2025)
- Total assets: ▲CA$15.310 billion (2025)
- Total equity: ▲CA$8.264 billion (2025)
- Number of employees: 711 (2025)
- Parent: Shell Canada
- Website: www.arcresources.com

ARC Resources Ltd. is a Canadian energy company with operations focused in the Montney resource play in Alberta and northeast British Columbia. The company has been operating since 1996.

== History ==
ARC was founded in 1996 as a royalty trust with the acquisition of 21 properties from Mobil Oil Canada. The acquisition was funded by an initial IPO of $180 million on the Toronto Stock Exchange. The company operated as a royalty trust from inception in 1996 until December 31, 2010. As a result of the Canadian Government's change in the tax treatment of trusts ARC converted from a trust to a corporation on January 1, 2011.

=== Acquisitions and disposals ===
- In 1999, ARC acquires Starcor Energy Royalty Fund and Orion Energy Trust.
- In 2001, ARC reaches $1 billion market capitalization. ARC completes the acquisition of Startech Energy Inc. for $340 million deal.
- In 2003, ARC purchases Star Oil & Gas Ltd. for $710 million, including the Dawson gas field.
- In 2005, ARC announces a $462 million strategic acquisition of properties in the Pembina and Redwater fields from Imperial Oil and ExxonMobil.
- In 2010, ARC completes the acquisition of Storm Exploration Inc., adding the Parkland field.
- In 2016, ARC sold $700 million in assets in Southeast Saskatchewan to Spartan Energy Corporation.
- In 2021, ARC closed its strategic combination with Seven Generations Energy Ltd. in an all stock deal valued at $8.1 billion inclusive of debt. The resulting company continued to operate as ARC Resources Ltd.

=== 2026 Shell acquisition ===
On April 27, 2026, it was announced that Shell plc agreed to buy ARC Resources in a deal valued at $22 billion. The deal was closed on September 2, 2026.

== Areas of operation ==
With operations spanning western Canada, ARC's activities include the exploration, development and production of conventional oil and natural gas reserves. As at Q2 2021, ARC's commodity mix was approximately 60% natural gas and 40% liquids.

ARC has operations in two core areas across Western Canada:

- Northeast British Columbia, including the Attachie, Greater Dawson, Parkland/Tower, and Sunrise fields
- Northern Alberta, including the Ante Creek and Kakwa field
