= Toronto Regiment =

The Toronto Regiment
- Active: 1920–1936
- Country: Canada
- Branch: Canadian Militia
- Type: Line infantry
- Role: Infantry
- Part of: Non-Permanent Active Militia
- Garrison/HQ: Toronto, Ontario
- Motto(s): Nec aspera terrent (Latin for 'Difficulties be damned / and difficulties do not daunt')
- March: Quick: “Here's to the Maiden”
- Engagements: First World War
- Battle honours: See #Battle honours

The Toronto Regiment was an infantry regiment of the Non-Permanent Active Militia of the Canadian Militia (now the Canadian Army). The regiment was formed in 1920 when the war-raised 3rd Battalion (Toronto Regiment) of the Canadian Expeditionary Force was incorporated after the First World War into the post-war Canadian Militia. In 1936, the regiment was amalgamated with The Royal Grenadiers to form The Royal Regiment of Toronto Grenadiers (now The Royal Regiment of Canada).

== Lineage ==
- Originated on 1 May 1920, in Toronto, Ontario, as The Toronto Regiment.
- Amalgamated on 15 December 1936 with The Royal Grenadiers and redesignated as The Royal Regiment of Toronto Grenadiers (now The Royal Regiment of Canada).

== Perpetuations ==
- 3rd Battalion (Toronto Regiment), CEF
- 124th Battalion (Governor General's Body Guard), CEF
- 170th Battalion (Mississauga Horse), CEF
- 204th Battalion (Beavers), CEF

== Alliances ==
- United Kingdom - The King's Regiment (Liverpool) (1927-1936)

== Battle honours ==
- Ypres, 1915, '17 (Note: Selected to be borne on colours and appointments)
- Gravenstafel
- St. Julien
- Festubert, 1915
- Mount Sorrel
- Somme, 1916
- Pozières
- Flers-Courcelette
- Ancre Heights
- Arras 1917, '18
- Vimy, 1917
- Arleux
- Scarpe, 1917, '18
- Hill 70
- Passchendaele
- Amiens
- Drocourt-Quéant
- Hindenburg Line
- Canal du Nord
- Pursuit to Mons
- France and Flanders, 1915–18
