= Peter Yarranton =

England international rugby union player & sports administrator

- Born: Peter George Yarranton; 30 September 1924 Acton, London
- Died: 1 June 2003 (aged 78) Teddington, Middlesex
- School: Holy Innocents School, Kingsbury; Willesden Technical College
- Occupation(s): Industrial Relations – Oil & gas

Rugby union career
- Position: Lock
Senior career
Years	Team	Apps	(Points)
to 1968	Wasps		
International career
Years	Team	Apps	(Points)
1954–55	England	5	(0)

Sir Peter George Yarranton (30 September 1924 – 1 June 2003) was chairman of the United Kingdom Sports Council from 1989 to 1994, and a notable figure in the world of rugby union, both as a player and as an administrator, for more than 40 years.

He was born in Acton in London, the son of Edward John Yarranton (1884-1954) and Nora Ellen (née Atkins) (1900-1978), his father's second wife. His father had left the family's bookbinding business to become a senior commercial traveller for Winsor & Newton, the supplier of artists' materials. An older half-brother was Donald Yarranton, who found fame later in life as the actor Howard Lang, playing Captain Baines in The Onedin Line.

== Rugby playing career ==
Yarranton was educated at Holy Innocents School, Kingsbury, northwest London, where he was head chorister and at Willesden Technical College. In 1942, he joined the Royal Air Force and subsequently flew Mitchell and Liberator bombers in the Burma campaign. He captained the RAF swimming and water polo teams, and was introduced – at the age of 24 – to rugby. He developed into a powerful, mobile second row forward, capable of holding his own in the rough and tumble of the sport as well as claiming the ball with prodigious leaps in the line-out.

He formed a lifelong connection with the Wasps club, whom he captained for much of the late 1950s, and he also turned out for London, Middlesex and the RAF. In 1954 and 1955, he played for England against the other Home Nations, and against France and New Zealand. He kept fit well into his forties, when he became club secretary of Wasps, and in 1963 came out of retirement to play in a match for the Barbarians, the celebrated scratch side which he had also earlier captained.

== Business career ==
Yarranton left the RAF in 1957 in the rank of flight lieutenant and joined Shell-Mex and BP as an operations trainee. He came to specialise in industrial relations and rose through the ranks in this field and from 1975 until 1977, was the manager of Shell UK Oil's plant and engineering division. In 1978, he left this post to work for another arm of Shell, the Lensbury sports and social club, based on 40 acres (160,000 m^{2}) near his home at Teddington. It was here that Yarranton began to put his business skills at the service of sport, and under his management the club became one of the largest sports and conference centres in Europe, even attracting international teams to its training facilities.

== Rugby Football Union ==
Yarranton was president of the Rugby Football Union from 1991 to 1992. He had already served a game about which he was passionate in almost every capacity, from international player to club secretary, and had been public relations adviser to the RFU for a decade. Many fans were also familiar with his voice from his broadcasts for the BBC, or had relished his breezy observations over the tannoy in the Middlesex Sevens tournament at Twickenham in the 1960s and 1970s. Behind the scenes he had also helped to set in motion the rebuilding of the national stadium, and it was fitting that Yarranton's term of office should coincide with England reaching the final of the Rugby World Cup that year at rugby's headquarters.

== Sports Council ==
Yarranton became chairman of the Sports Council, the quango charged with disbursing public money to sport, in 1989 – a difficult moment in its history. The Conservative government was steadily reducing its annual grant, while in the press criticism was being made of Britain's continued failings in international competitions, as well as of the council's own unwieldy internal structure and its propensity for in-fighting. These problems Yarranton met in his customary cheerful fashion, although, through little fault of his own, he was unable to solve many of them.

He was a capable, articulate man, well-versed in the ways of committees and practised in the art of keeping an open mind. While he was at home encouraging athletes in the dressing room and on the big sporting occasions, he was not afraid to stand up to his political masters, criticising their lack of funding for sport in the inner cities and their policy of selling off playing fields. He was an early advocate of a national lottery whose profits could be channelled into sport.

== Retirement ==
Following his retirement from the Sports Council and from Lensbury at the age of 70, Yarranton concentrated on his many other responsibilities. Among his other positions, he was a governor of the London Marathon Trust; patron of the Royal Canoe Club Trust; chairman of the Sport Supports St John Ambulance Committee; and, in 2001, Master of the Worshipful Company of Gold and Silver Wyre Drawers. He was also president of Surbiton Croquet Club. He was knighted in the 1992 Birthday Honours for services to sport.
