= Shell USA =

American subsidiary of Shell plc

Shell USA, Inc.

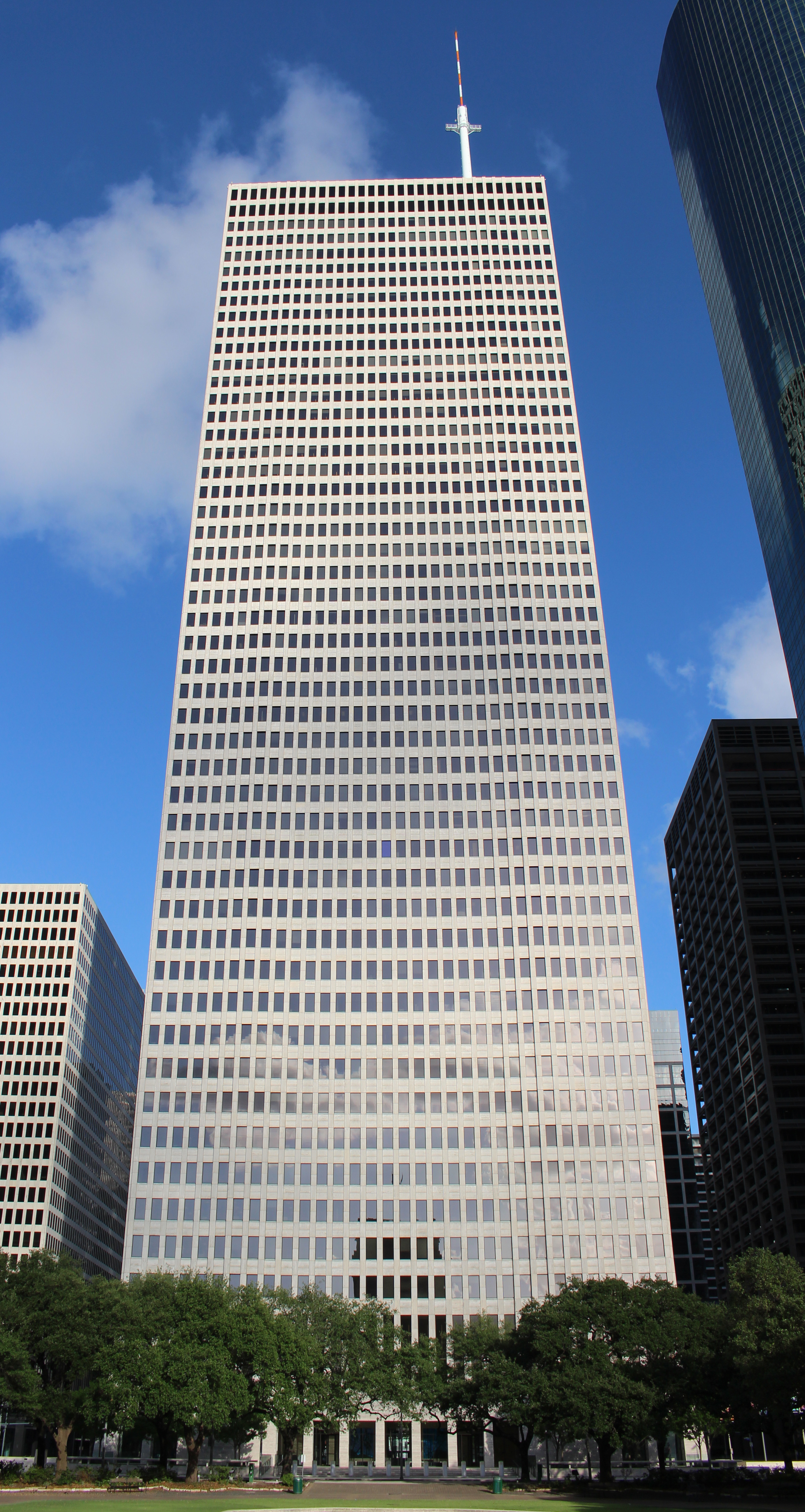
- One Shell Plaza, Shell USA's former headquarters in Houston, Texas.
- Formerly: Shell Oil Company, Inc.
- Type: Subsidiary
- Industry: Petroleum
- Founded: 1912; 114 years ago U.S.
- Headquarters: Houston, Texas, United States
- Key people: Colette Hirstius (president)
- Products: Fuel, motor oil
- Revenue: ▼US$ 37.376 billion (2013/2016)
- Number of employees: 12,100+ (2021)
- Parent: Shell plc
- Website: shell.us

Shell USA, Inc. (formerly Shell Oil Company, Inc. until 2022) an American wholly owned subsidiary of Shell plc, a British corporation "oil major" which is among the largest oil companies in the world. Approximately 12,000 Shell employees are based in the U.S. Its U.S. headquarters are in Houston, Texas. Shell USA, including its consolidated companies and its share in equity companies, is one of America's largest oil and natural gas producers, natural gas marketers, fuel marketers and petrochemical manufacturers.

== History ==
Royal Dutch-Shell began operations in the United States in the 1910s. Early acquisitions included William Miller Graham's California Oilfields Limited in 1913. The present company formed when two Royal Dutch-Shell subsidiaries, Shell Oil Company of California and Oklahoma's Roxana Petroleum, merged with the Union Oil Company of Delaware.

Shell drilled the Alamitos oil well in Signal Hill, California in 1921.

In 1979, Shell purchased Belridge Oil Company for $3.65 billion, which at the time was called the "biggest cash takeover in American history" by US government sources. Shell also invested in offshore oil and gas in the Gulf of Mexico.

In 1997, Shell and Texaco entered into two refining/marketing joint ventures. One combined their Midwestern and Western operations and was known as Equilon. The other, known as Motiva Enterprises, combined the Eastern and Gulf Coast operations of Shell Oil and Star Enterprise, itself a joint venture between Saudi Aramco and Texaco.

After Texaco merged with Chevron in 2001, Shell purchased Texaco's shares in the joint ventures. In 2002, Shell began converting these Texaco stations to the Shell brand, a process that was to be completed by June 2004 and was called "the largest retail re-branding initiative in American business history".

In recent years, The Shell Oil Company's Midstream, and Downstream, in particular, have become limited to petroleum, and chemical products. This has come as a result of Royal Dutch Shell breaking off its Natural Gas and power businesses into a new segment named Integrated Gas. The Shell Oil Company's former Natural Gas, and energy divisions are now Shell Energy North America, a closely integrated, but a distinctive entity that runs across North America and is headquartered out of Houston, Texas.

In June 2025, news broke of Shell seeking to acquire competitor BP in what would be the largest oil deal in decades.

On August 6, 2025, it was announced that Shell would be ceasing the operations of Volta Charging (originally acquired and merged its operations with its Recharge Network in 2023) by November and would be shutting its 2,000 charging stations and laying off 190 employees. A selection of those employed at Volta are eligible to reapply at positions through Shell.

== Activities ==
Shell is the market leader through approximately 14,000 Shell-branded fuel stations in the U.S. which also serve as Shell's most visible public presence, and comes closest to serving all 50 states, lacking a presence only in Montana. At its gas stations, Shell provides diesel fuel, fuel and LPG. Shell Oil Company was a 50/50 partner with the Saudi Arabian government-owned oil company Saudi Aramco in Motiva Enterprises, a refining and marketing joint venture which owns and operates three oil refineries on the Gulf Coast of the United States. However, Shell is currently divesting its interest in Motiva.

Shell products include oils, fuels, and car services as well as exploration, production, and refining of petroleum products. The Shell Martinez Refinery in Martinez, California, the first Shell refinery in the United States, supplied Shell and Texaco stations in the West and Midwest until its sale to PBF Energy in 2020.

Shell fuel previously included the RU2000 and SU2000 lines (later there was a SU2000E) but they have been superseded by the V-Power line.

In 2023 Shell USA (North American division of Shell plc) became the Official Fuel of the NTT IndyCar Series they will supply 100% Ethanol-sourced fuel. They are also the Official Fuel of the Indianapolis Motor Speedway.

In 2023, the first deliveries of sustainable aviation fuel (SAF) to Shell Trading (US) Company (Shell) from Montana Renewables took place. The companies have entered into a multi-year agreement, with the fuel received being distributed by Shell and subsidiaries across the country to accelerate decarbonization.

== Relationship with Shell plc ==
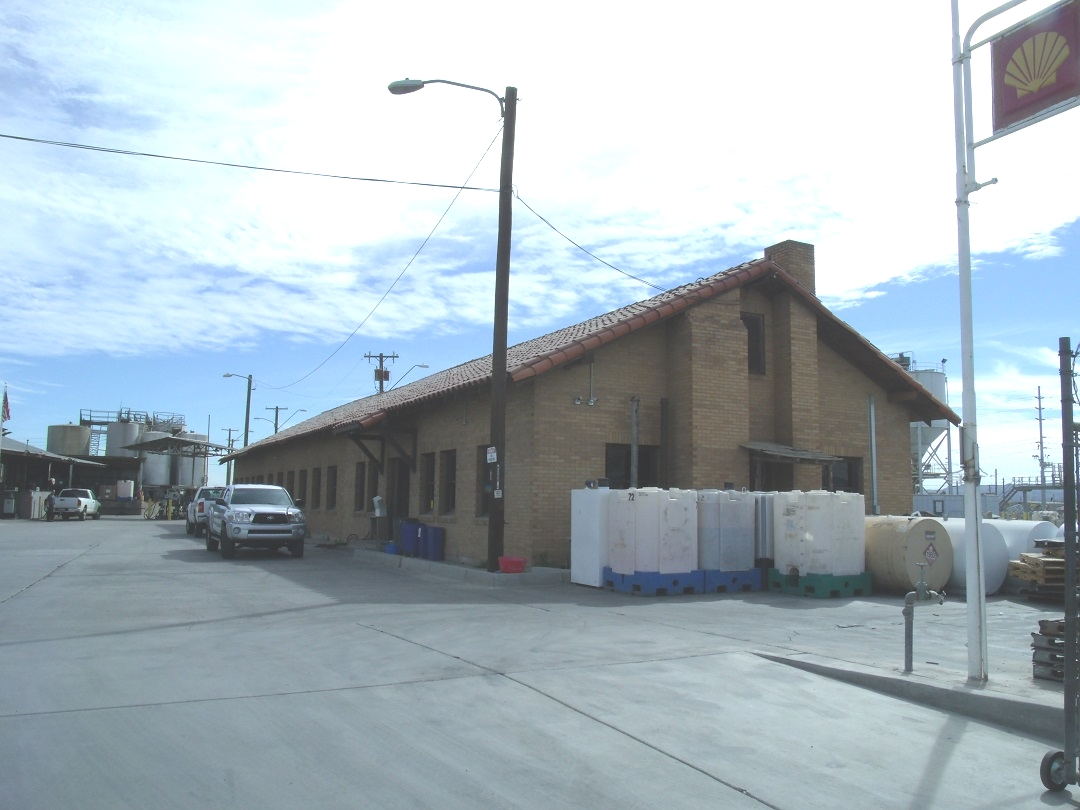
The Shell Oil Company Warehouse, built in 1925 and located at 425 S. 16th Ave. Phoenix, Arizona. It is listed in the National Register of Historic Places. Reference #85002073

Until the mid-1980s, Shell's business in the United States was substantially independent. Limited direct involvement from the main office in The Hague, Netherlands, and having its stock "Shell Oil" traded on the New York Stock Exchange were factors. However, in 1984, Royal Dutch Shell made a bid to purchase those shares of Shell Oil Company it did not own (around 30%) and despite some opposition from some minority shareholders which led to a court case, Shell completed the buyout for a sum of $5.7 billion.

Despite the acquisition, however, Shell Oil remained a fairly independent business. This was due in part to complex legal reasons, as Royal Dutch Shell feared that there could be onerous liability problems if closer control of Shell Oil's affairs was exercised by the "parent company". One consequence of this independence was that the Shell logo used in the U.S. was slightly different from that used in the rest of the world. In the 1980s, Shell Oil's independence began to gradually erode as the "parent company" took a more hands-on approach to running the business. The logo used in the United States is the same as that used elsewhere since June 1, 1998.

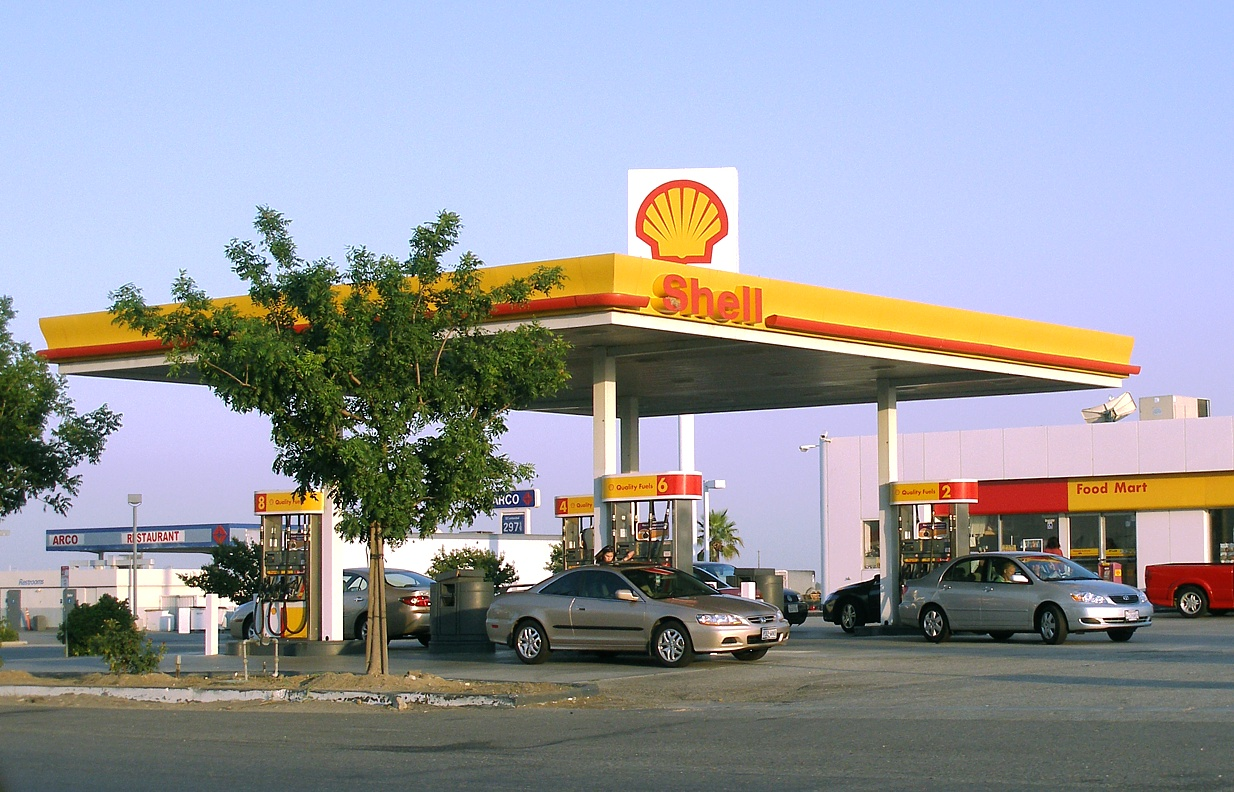
A Shell gas station near Lost Hills, California.

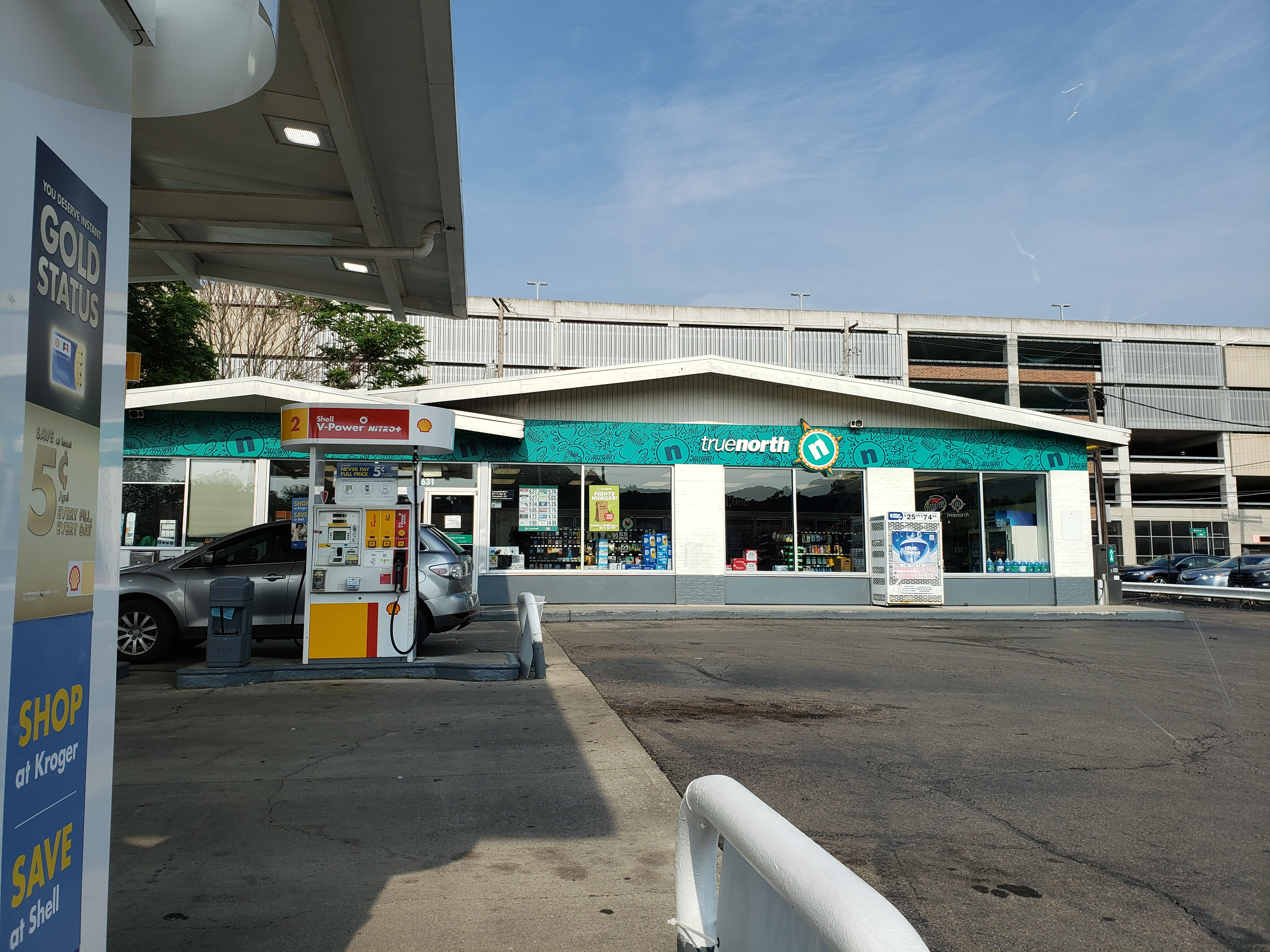
A Shell station in Columbus, Ohio in 2020. The building, which formerly housed a service station, was converted into a convenience store.

In January 2018, Royal Dutch Shell acquired a 44% interest in solar energy company Silicon Ranch, run by CEO Matt Kisber. The takeover was part of the global New Energies project, with the aim of bringing solar renewable options to U.S. customers. The company paid up to an estimated $217 million to take over from former minority shareholders Partners Group.

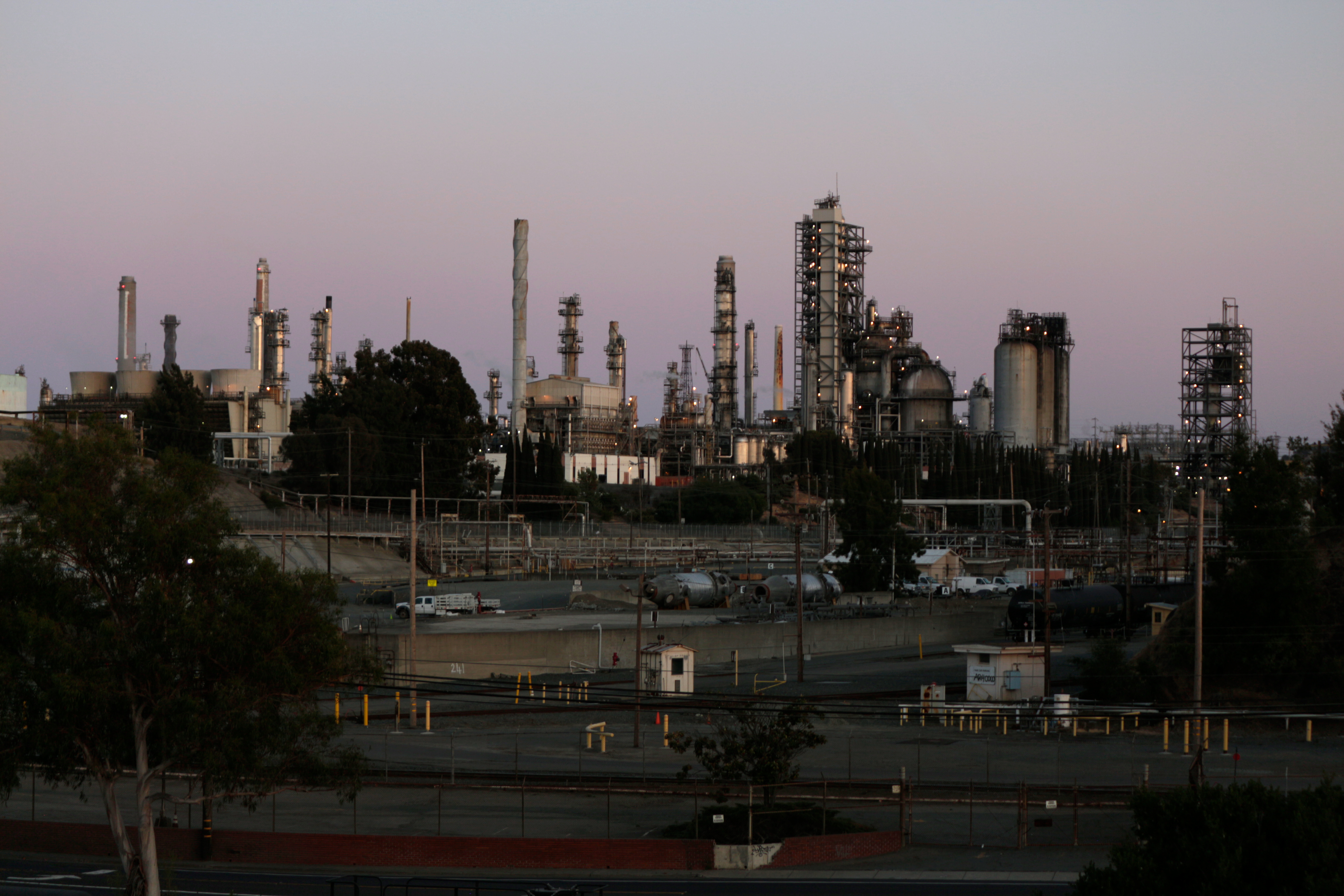
The Shell Martinez Refinery, which operated in Martinez, California, for over 100 years before being sold to PBF Energy in 2020.

In October 2018, the company installed a 285-foot-high quench tower at the Shell Chemical Appalachia L.L.C. Pittsburgh plant, which transfers heat absorbed by the water circulation process to use across other areas of the site.

== Subsidiaries ==
- Shell Development Emeryville – Research facility that operated from 1928 to 1966 in California.
- Pennzoil
- Quaker State
- Jiffy Lube
- Deer Park Refinery – In 2022, Shell completed sale of their interest in the Deer Park refinery to Pemex.
- Limejump
- Greenlots – Charging stations and systems provider for others like Electrify America
- Amilcar Petroleum Operations (APO) – Joint venture with the state-owned petroleum company in Tunisia Entreprise Tunisienne d'Activités Pétrolières created on July 1, 2014.
- Specialty Oil Company – Walmart Super Tech Brand

== Legal issues ==
=== Environmental ===
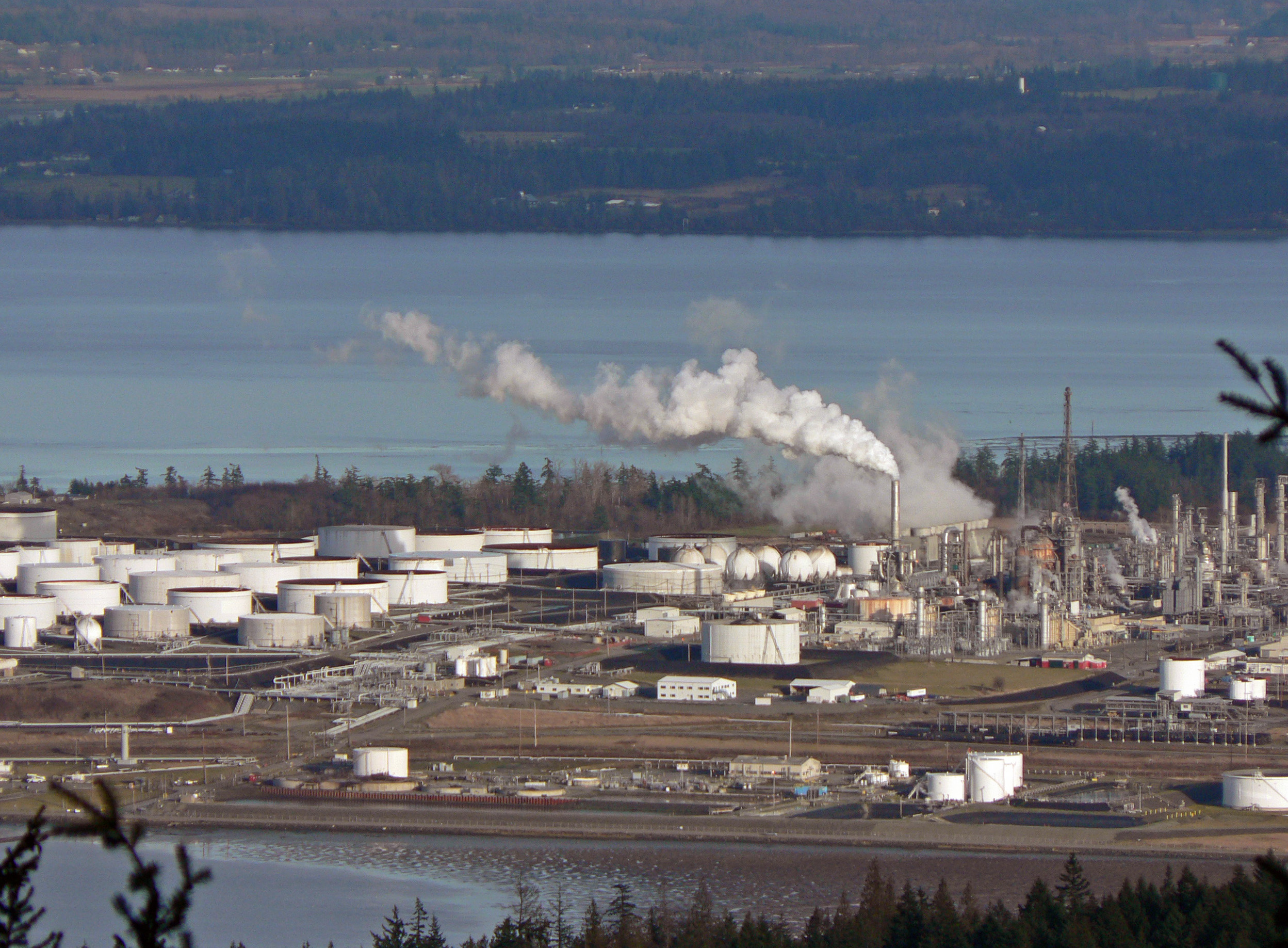
Storage tanks and towers at Shell Puget Sound Refinery, Anacortes, Washington.

Shell Puget Sound Refinery, Anacortes, Washington, was fined $291,000 from 2006 to 2010 for violations of the Clean Air Act making it the second most-fined violator in the Pacific Northwest. As of 2011, it has been listed as a "high-priority violator" since 2008.

In 2008, a lawsuit was filed against Shell Oil Company for alleged Clean Air Act violation. Shell Deer Park Refinery 20 miles east of Houston, was the nation's eighth-largest oil refinery and one of the world's largest petrochemical producers. The facility was also the second-largest source of air pollution in Harris County, which ranked among the lowest in the nation in several measures of air quality. According to Sierra Club and Environment Texas, analysis of Shell's reports to the Texas Commission on Environmental Quality, air pollutants released at Deer Park since 2003 exceeded the EPA's emissions limits.

Will Oremus from Slate magazine states, "The company's business depends on being able to anticipate and respond quickly to seismic shifts in the energy market. So it employs a team of big-thinking futurists, called scenario planners, to keep it a step ahead. In 2008, the company released a fresh pair of scenarios for how the world might respond to climate change over the coming decades. Both were predicated on what the company called 'three hard truths': that global energy demand is rising, that the supply of conventional energy will not be able to keep up, and that climate change is both real and dangerous."

=== Polybutylene lawsuit ===
Between 1978 and 1995, Shell Oil produced polybutylene pipes, which corrode when exposed to chlorine. A class action lawsuit was filed in 1995 against Shell Oil when the polybutylene pipes caused flooding in many households in the U.S. and Canada. The settlement required Shell Oil to pay for the re-installation of piping for millions of houses for claims filed through May 2009.

=== Campaign violations ===
About 6,000 Shell workers and contractors were instructed to attend a Donald Trump speech held on August 13, 2019, or take the day off without pay, losing about $700 from overtime and per diem. During his address, Trump called out specific union leaders to declare their voting loyalty. Many of the union leaders present were not consulted before the event, and memos sent to contractor management forbade any protest. Federal law prohibits a corporation from making a contribution.

== Leadership ==
=== President ===
1. Avery D. Andrews, 1922–
2. William H. Allen, 1922–
3. Henri W. A. Deterding, 1922–
4. Jan Carel van Panthaleon van Eck, 1924–1933
5. R. G. A. van der Woude, 1933–1947
6. Alexander Fraser, 1947–1949
7. H. S. M. Burns, 1949–1961
8. Monroe Edward Spaght, 1961–1966
9. Richard C. McCurdy, 1966–1971
10. Denis B. Kemball-Cook, 1971–1976
11. John Frank Bookout Jr., 1976–

=== Chairman of the Board ===
1. Henri W. A. Deterding, 1924–1937
2. Frederick Godber, 1937–1946
3. Sir George Legh-Jones, 1946–1951
4. Sir Francis Hopwood, 1951–1958
5. John Hugo Loudon, 1958–1965
6. David H. Barran, 1971–1972
7. G. A. Wagner, 1972–1977
8. Dirk De Bruyne, 1977–1985
9. Lodewijk Christiaan van Wachem, 1985–

== See also ==
- Pennsylvania Shell ethylene cracker plant
- Petroleum geology
- Fred Meissner, Shell Laboratories, Petroleum Explorationist, Professor Colorado School of Mines
- M. King Hubbert, Shell Laboratories, Petroleum Geologist, created the Hubbert peak theory model of oil depletion
- Geophysics
- List of automotive fuel brands
