= 3rd Battalion (Toronto Regiment), CEF =

- The distinguishing patch of the 3rd Battalion (Toronto Regiment), CEF.
- Active: 1914-1919
- Country: Canada
- Branch: Canadian Expeditionary Force
- Type: battalion of the Canadian Expeditionary Force
- Role: Infantry
- Size: One Battalion
- Part of: 1st Canadian Brigade, 1st Canadian Division
- Garrison/HQ: Toronto, Ontario
- Engagements: First World War
- Battle honours: Ypres and along the Western Front.

The 3rd Battalion (Toronto Regiment), Canadian Expeditionary Force was an infantry battalion of the Canadian Expeditionary Force that saw service in the First World War. It was created on 2 September 1914 with recruits from Toronto, primarily from the Queen's Own Rifles of Canada with additional drafts from the 10th Royal Grenadiers and the Governor General's Body Guard.

== History ==
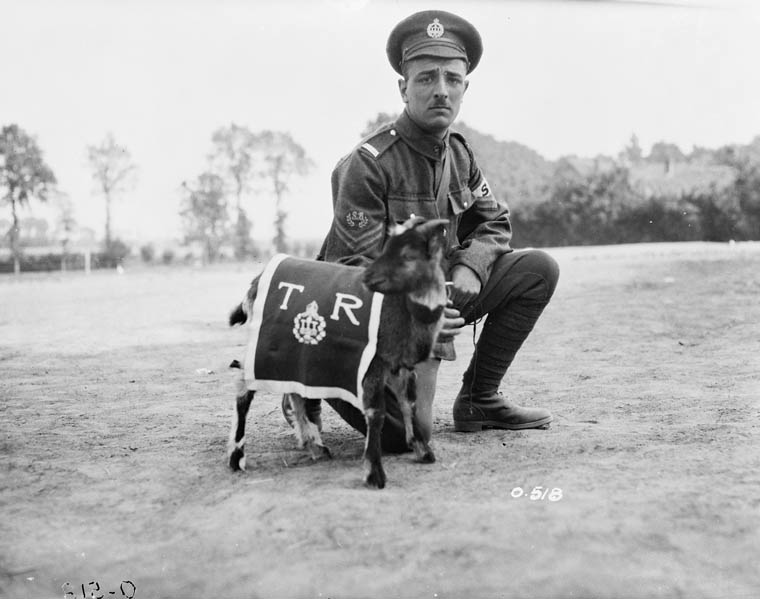
The mascot of the 3rd Canadian Infantry Battalion, August 1916

The battalion organized and trained at Camp Valcartier before sailing for England from Quebec City on board the SS Tunisian on 25 September 1914. They arrived in England on 16 October with a strength of 42 officers and 1123 men. The battalion became part of the 1st Canadian Division, 1st Canadian Infantry Brigade where it saw action at Ypres, Vimy Ridge and along the Western Front. It was later reinforced by the 12th Canadian Reserve Battalion.

In the attack on Vimy Ridge, the battalion had a relatively easy time due to very successful artillery barrages but still lost around 150 killed or wounded.

286 soldiers of the 3rd Battalion were taken prisoner during the war - all but 21 during the 2nd Battle of Ypres during April and May 1915.

=== Demobilization, re-organization and perpetuation ===
The battalion returned to Canada from England on the SS Olympic arriving in Halifax on 21 April 1919, then in Toronto by train and demobilizing in the afternoon of 23 April 1919. Only 40 of the original contingent from 1914 arrived back at the end of the war although others had been demobilized or taken prisoners of war. [See list below.]

With the re-organization of the Canadian Militia, it was recreated as The Toronto Regiment by General Order dated 1 May 1920. On 15 December 1936 it was amalgamated with the Royal Grenadiers to form the Royal Regiment of Toronto Grenadiers which subsequently became the known as The Royal Regiment of Canada, 11 February 1939.

Today the battalion is perpetuated by The Queen's Own Rifles of Canada and The Royal Regiment of Canada.

== Commanding officers ==
All three Commanding Officers had previously served in the Canadian Militia with The Queen's Own Rifles of Canada:

- August 1914 to November 1915 - Lieutenant Colonel Robert Rennie, MVO (later Major General Rennie, CB, CMG, DSO, MVO, VD)
- November 1915 to October 1916 - Lieutenant Colonel William D. Allan, DSO (He died as the results of an earlier wound.)
- October 1916 to April 1919 - Lieutenant Colonel Joseph B. Rogers, CMG, DSO, MC

== Battle honours ==
The following battle honours were awarded the regiment for service in France and Belgium (those in capital letters were authorized to be shown on the Regimental Colours):

- YPRES 1915
- Gravenstafel
- ST JULIEN
- FESTUBERT 1915
- MOUNT SORREL
- SOMME 1916

- Pozières
- Flers-Courcelette
- Ancre Heights
- Arras 1917
- VIMY 1917
- Arleux

- Scarpe 1917
- Hill 70
- Ypres, 1917
- PASSCHENDAELE
- AMIENS
- Arras, 1918

- Scarpe 1918
- DROCOURT-QUEANT
- Hindenberg Line
- CANAL DU NORD
- Pursuit to Mons
- France and Flanders 1915-18

== Honours awarded ==
- 2 Victoria Crosses (VC)
- 1 Companion of the Order of St Michael and St George (CMG)
- 11 Distinguished Service Order (DSO)
- 2 Bars to the Distinguished Service Order
- 1 Officer of the Most Excellent Order of the British Empire (OBE)

- 50 Military Crosses
- 11 Bars to the Military Cross
- 42 Distinguished Conduct Medals
- 235 Military Medals

- 23 Bars to the Military Medal
- 6 Meritorious Service Medals
- 9 Foreign Decorations
- 44 Mentioned in Despatches

== See also ==
- List of infantry battalions in the Canadian Expeditionary Force
