= Clive Mather =

British businessman (born 1947)

Harold Clive Mather
- Born: 19 September 1947 (age 78)
- Education: Warwick School; Lincoln College, Oxford (BA, 1969)
- Spouse: Ann Mason (m. 1976)

Harold Clive Mather (born 19 September 1947) is an English executive and company director. From 2004 to 2007 he served as the president of Shell Canada. Mather is currently the chairman of the Church of England Pensions Board.

== Biography ==
He is Chair of the Church of England Pensions Board having been appointed by General Synod on 20 February 2019. The Pensions Board provides pensions, housing and retirement services for those who have served or worked for the Church. It serves over 40,000 people across almost 700 employers and manages funds in excess of £2.8 billion. The Board actively engages with companies in which it is invested and is committed to managing its funds in a way that reflects the Church's teaching and values. It is the only pension provider offering schemes that fully comply with the Church of England ethical investment policies. Climate change is a systemic risk to all long-term investors. Both an ethical and financial issue, it is a critical focus of the Board's investment approach across all asset classes as well as our engagement with companies. A key tool in this is the Transition Pathway Initiative (TPI) which CEPB continues to jointly chair with the Environment Agency Pensions Fund. TPI assesses companies’ preparedness for transition to a low-carbon economy and is backed by investors with over $18 trillion in AUM. It has developed a new Paris aligned, passive global equity index with FTSE and the LSE which was launched on 30 January 2020, which directly incorporates assessments of companies under TPI. The Church of England Pensions Board is a leading, activist investor and works with many other Funds around the world through coalitions like Climate Change 100+ in order to leverage its influence and impact. Climate Action 100+ is an investor initiative to ensure the world's largest corporate greenhouse gas emitters take necessary action on climate change. The companies include 100 ‘systemically important emitters’, accounting for two-thirds of annual global industrial emissions, alongside more than 60 others with significant opportunity to drive the clean energy transition. To date, more than 500 investors with more than USD $47 trillion in assets under management have signed on to the initiative.

He serves as a Director of Emissions Reduction Alberta (ERA) which works to develop and commercialise technologies which will reduce carbon and other GHG emissions in Canada and beyond; to stimulate technical innovation in order to enhance the capacity and reputation of the Province; and to protect and grow the economy, through greater diversity, skilling up and employment.

He is a Trustee of Emmaus Road Community Church in Guildford, UK. Emmaus Road is a growing, multi site church with congregations in and around Guildford, Woking and Aldershot. As the European hub for the 24-7 Prayer movement the church connects with thousands of others from around the world at the Wildfires Festival in Spring and the 24-7 Prayer Gathering in Autumn.

He was the Chair of Relational Peacebuilding Initiatives (RPI) based in Geneva until 2023, working to bring relational solutions to long standing conflict situations in various parts of the world. The current main focus is the Korean Peninsula. After 70 years of bitter division, North and South Korea have now begun political talks aimed at replacing recrimination with co-operation. What is needed is a parallel process which will bring economic growth and social transformation to the whole Peninsula. RPI is already working behind the scenes to develop a partnership model that will enable North and South to agree together the values, goals and priorities in each of the main sectors of society. This is vital if economic progress is to be demonstrated in the short-term and the possibility of peaceful unification nurtured for the future.

He was the founding Chair of Tearfund USA, which was established in 2018 as a member of the global Tearfund family. He retired in January 2022 when his American successor was ready to take over. In September 2018 he had retired as Chair of Tearfund after serving his full term of 10 years. During this time he visited Tearfund's work in 47 countries, encouraging partners and local churches. Tearfund is a Christian relief and development agency "following Jesus where the need is greatest". It is committed to eradicating poverty through 3 primary channels. Firstly through its disaster relief capacity, it is able to bring front line emergency help to those communities ravaged by war, earthquake or other calamities. Secondly working through it worldwide partners and a global network of local churches, it is able to transform families and communities by empowering the local church to mobilise resources that are available and inspire collective action to tackle poverty in all its forms. And thirdly through its advocacy, Tearfund highlights the impact of climate change, injustice and corruption on those least able to cope. It calls governments and global institutions to account, arguing for concerted global action and a fairer allocation of resources to meet the needs of the poor and oppressed.

In 2008 he was appointed Chairman of the Shell Pensions Trust Ltd, one of the biggest defined benefit pension funds in the UK. The Trust oversees the investment and management of the Shell Contributory Pension Fund, providing benefits for 40,000+ active and retired members of Royal Dutch Shell in the UK. He was also appointed Chairman of Shell's new UK defined contribution scheme, the UK Shell Pension Plan Trust Limited which started in 2013. He stepped down from both roles on 31 May 2018 after 10 years' service to the Funds.

In 2012, he was appointed Chairman of the Garden Tomb (Jerusalem) Association and stepped down in 2017 after serving his full term of 9 years as a Trustee. He is the former Chairman of Iogen Corporation, a Canadian bio-technology company specialising in enzyme technology and based in Ottawa. Iogen is the leading producer of cellulosic ethanol. He served as a Director for 10 years of which 9 were as Chairman. He retired in July 2017.

Mather is a former employee of Royal Dutch Shell. He joined Shell in the United Kingdom 1969 and retired in 2007. His career included assignments in Brunei, Gabon, South Africa, the Netherlands, Canada and the UK where he was Chairman of Shell UK Limited between 2002 and 2004. His last position was as President and CEO of Shell Canada Ltd based in Calgary, prior to its take over by Royal Dutch Shell Limited.

Mather was formerly Chairman of the UK Government/Industry CSR Academy, Deputy Chairman of the Windsor Leadership Trust and Chairman of the IMD Business Advisory Council in Switzerland. He has held a number of public appointments in the UK including Commissioner for the Equal Opportunities Commission, Chairman of the Petroleum Employer's Council and Chairman of the Lambeth Education Action Zone. In July 2009 he was appointed as one of the 12 members of the Premier's Council for Economic Strategy in Alberta. He has also served on the Royal Anniversary Trust for some 7 years.

Mather was educated at Warwick School and Lincoln College, Oxford. He is a Companion of the Chartered Management Institute and Fellow of the Chartered Institute of Personnel and Development. He speaks on issues of leadership, ethics, the environment and energy internationally.

== CABE Annual Hugh Kay Lecture 2013 ==
In November 2013 Mather gave a lecture in the Palace of Westminster to the Christian Association of Business Executives on the occasion of its 75th birthday. It was entitled "Time travel - has big business lost its compass?" For the full text see http://www.cabe-online.org/

== Evangelical Alliance speech ==
In October 2004 Mather gave a speech to the Evangelical Alliance in London entitled "Trust: Whose business is it" during which he said "Meticulous compliance with all the new regulations is a must, but will not be enough. We have to try harder; we have to set the highest standards in everything we do, because trust is essential to our business."

== Relationships Foundation ==
Mather has been involved with the Relationships Foundation to whom he has said "Concern for relationships is a vital part of sustainable development – whether economic, environmental or social - and must feature in political debate and decision making".
