= Scarpe 1917 (Battle honour) =

Scarpe 1917 was a battle honour awarded to units of the British and Imperial Armies that took part in one or more of the following engagements in the Great War:

- First Battle of the Scarpe, 9–14 Apr 1917
- Second Battle of the Scarpe, 23–24 Apr 1917
- Third Battle of the Scarpe, 3–4 May 1917
