= Grenadier =

Type of infantry soldier, now mostly unused

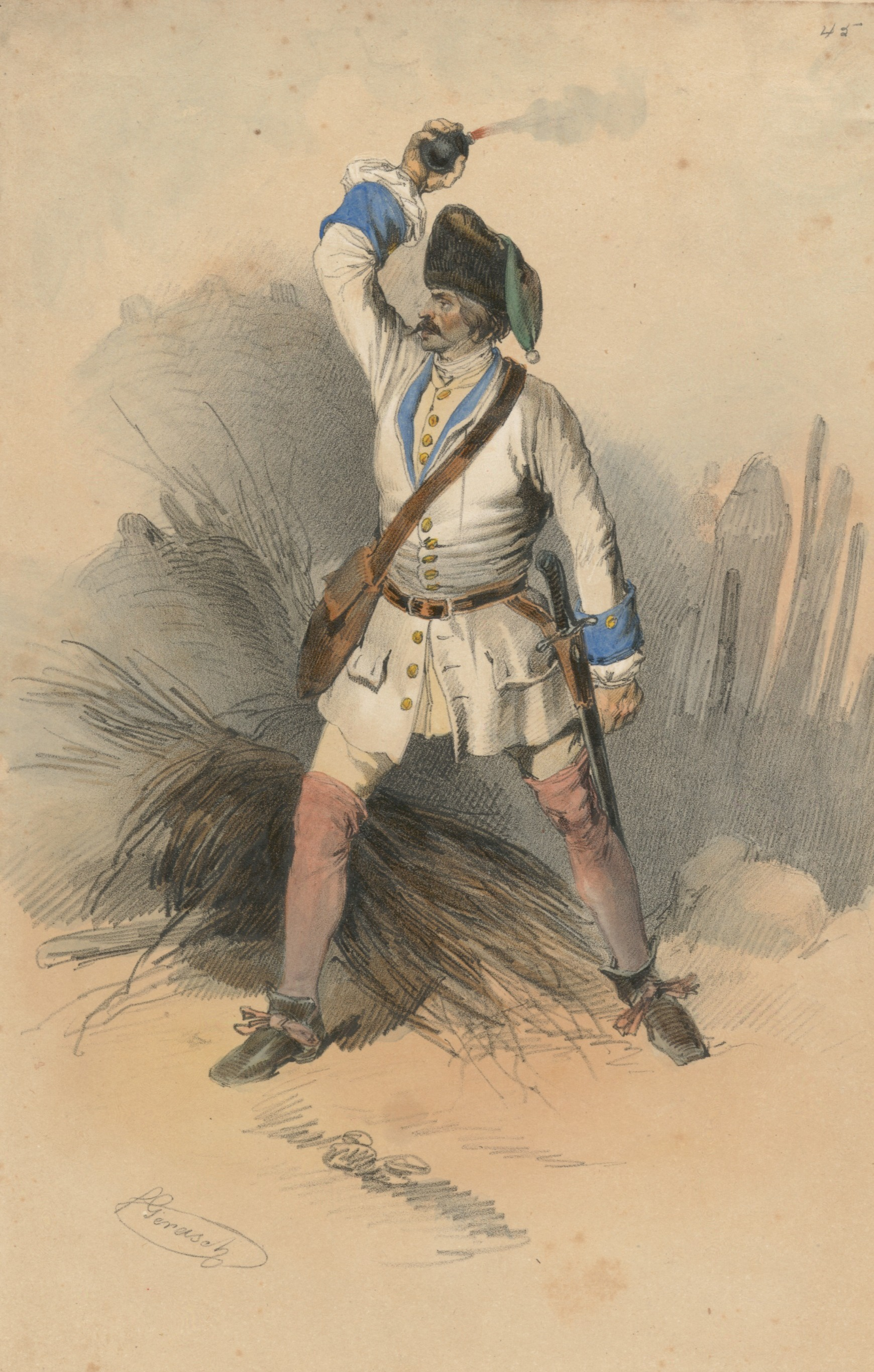
An Austrian grenadier in 1720

A grenadier (/ˌɡrɛnəˈdɪər/ GREN-ə-DEER, French: [ɡʁənadje]; derived from the word grenade) was historically an assault-specialist soldier who threw hand grenades in siege operation battles. The distinct combat function of the grenadier was established in the mid-17th century, when grenadiers were recruited from among the strongest and largest soldiers. By the 18th century, the grenadier dedicated to throwing hand grenades had become a less necessary specialist, yet in battle, the grenadiers were the physically robust soldiers who led vanguard assaults, such as storming fortifications in the course of siege warfare.

Certain countries such as France (Grenadiers à Cheval de la Garde Impériale) and Argentina (Regiment of Mounted Grenadiers) established units of Horse Grenadiers, and for a time the British Army had Horse Grenadier Guards. Like their infantry grenadier counterparts, these horse-mounted soldiers were chosen for their size and strength (heavy cavalry). In modern warfare, a grenadier is a soldier armed with a grenade launcher, either as a standalone weapon or attached to another service weapon.

== Origins ==
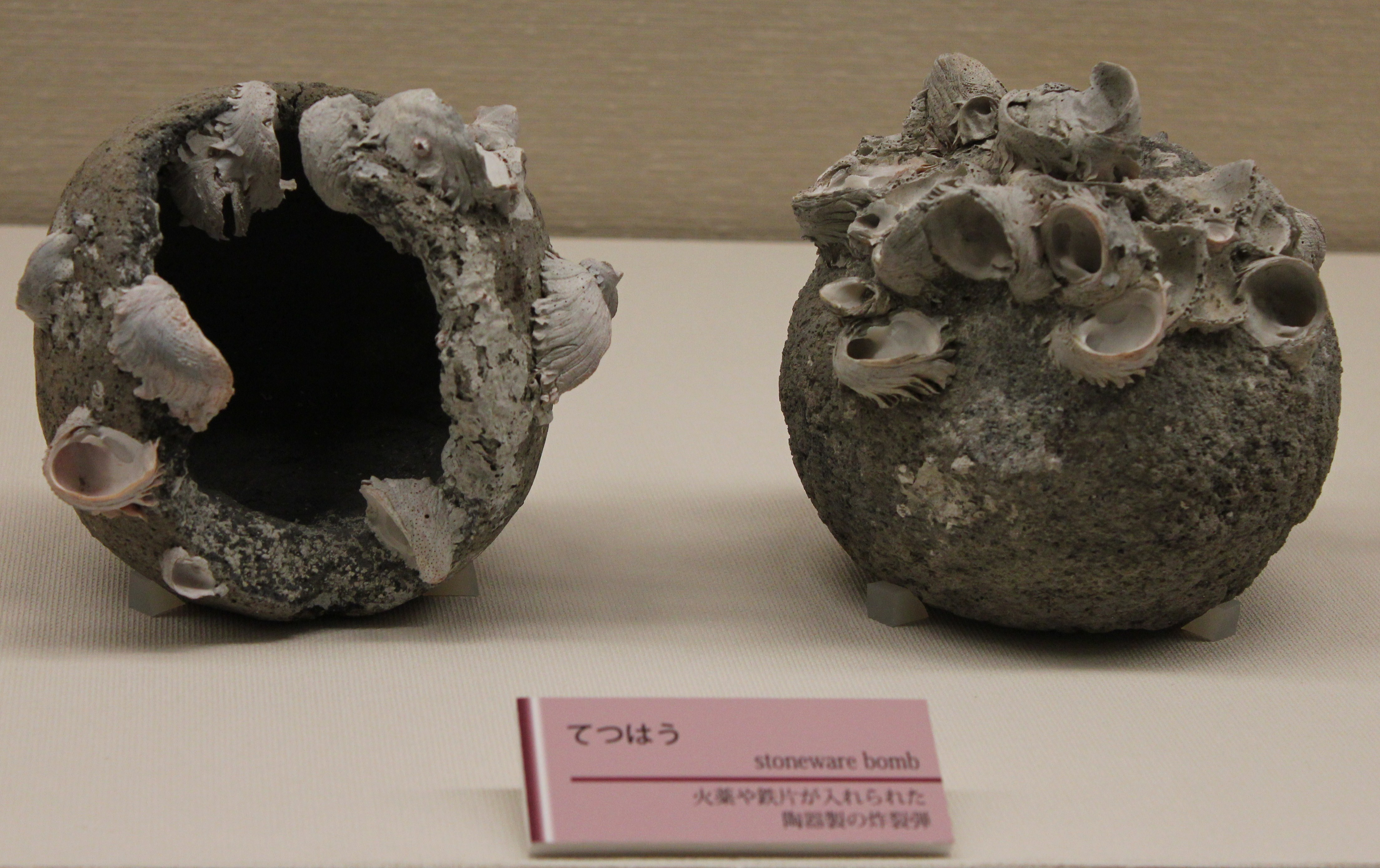
Thunder crash bombs used by the Yuan army during the first Mongol invasion of Japan in 1274

The concept of troops being equipped with grenades dates back to the Song dynasty, when Chinese soldiers used thunder crash bombs. The earliest references to soldiers using grenades in European armies dates back to the early modern era in the Austrian and Spanish armies. References to grenade-throwing troops also appear in England during the Wars of the Three Kingdoms, and it was during the reign of King Louis XIV that companies of soldiers serving as grenadiers were first introduced into the French Royal Army. According to René Chartrand, Jean Martinet formed a grenadier company in the Régiment du Roi in 1667. By 1670, 27 French infantry regiments were authorised to include elite companies trained to carry and hurl grenades.

The infantry of the Dutch States Army, influenced by their French invaders, adopted grenadiers in 1672. By 1678 six men in each company were trained to throw hand grenades, developed by the Dutch master fireworker Johan van Haren.

In May 1677, the English Army ordered that two soldiers of every Guards Regiment were to be trained as grenadiers; in April 1678 it was ordered that a company of grenadiers be added to the senior eight regiments of foot of the army. On 29 June of that year the diarist John Evelyn saw them drilling at an encampment at Hounslow, near London:

Now were brought into service a new sort of soldier called Grenadiers, who were dexterous in flinging hand grenadoes, every one having a pouch full; they had furred caps with coped crowns like Janizaries, which made them look very fierce, and some had long hoods hanging down behind, as we picture fools. Their clothing being likewise piebald, yellow and red.

=== Grenades ===
The first grenades were small iron spheres, roughly the size of a tennis ball, filled with gunpowder fused with a length of slow-match. The grenadiers had to be tall and strong enough to hurl these heavy objects far enough so as not to harm themselves or their comrades, and disciplined enough to stand at the forefront of the fight, light the fuse and throw at the appropriate moment to minimize the ability of an enemy to throw the grenade back. Understandably, such requirements led to grenadiers being regarded as an elite fighting force.

== Early distinctions of dress and equipment ==
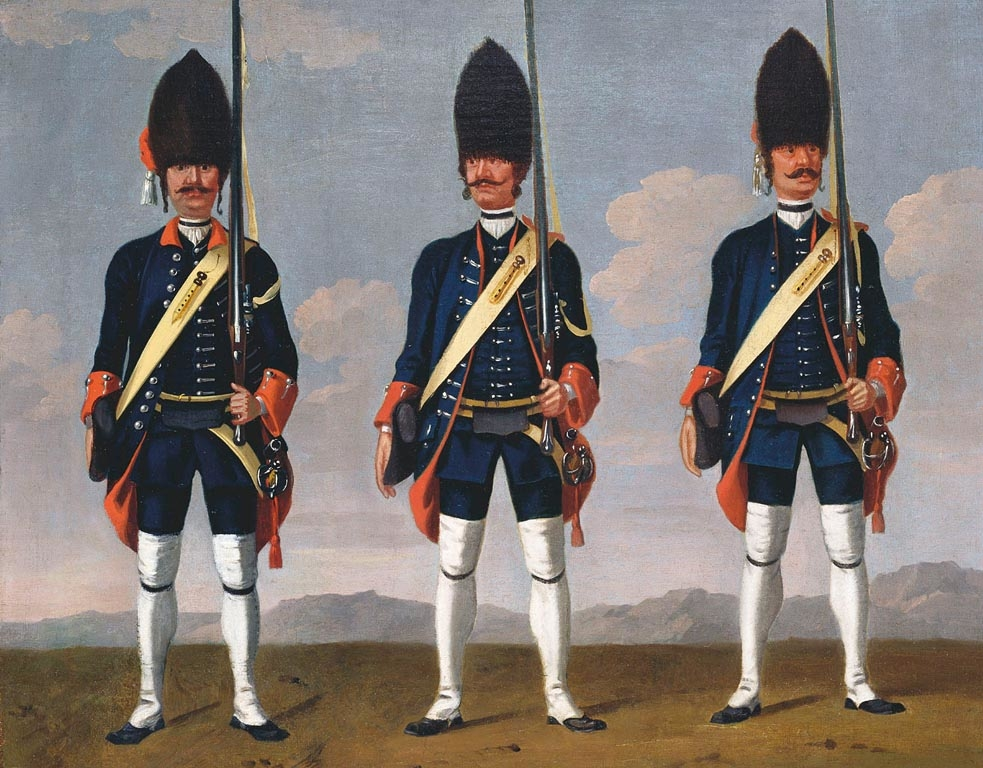
c. 1748 painting of three Swiss grenadiers wearing bearskins. Grenadiers wore tall headgear to accentuate their size.

The wide hats with broad brims characteristic of infantry during the late 17th century were in some armies discarded and replaced with caps. This was originally to allow the grenadier to sling his musket over his back with greater ease while throwing grenades (initially, only these troops were provided with slings). It has been suggested that a brimless hat also permitted the grenadier greater ease in throwing the grenade overhand. Preben Kannik, former Curator of the Danish Army Museum, however, definitely states that grenades were thrown underhand and that it was the slinging of firearms that required the special headdresses typical of early grenadiers.

The grenadiers of the French infantry were by the 1690s distinguished from their musketeer colleagues by special issues of equipment. These included slings for their flintlocks, curved sabres instead of straight swords, large leather pouches for grenades and hatchets. By 1700, grenadiers in the English and other armies had adopted a cap in the shape of a bishop's mitre, usually decorated with the regimental insignia in embroidered cloth. In addition to grenades, they were equipped with Flintlock muskets. Attached to the shoulder belt was a brass 'match case' that housed the slow match used to ignite the grenade fuse, a feature that was retained in later grenadier uniforms.

== Elite status in the 18th century ==
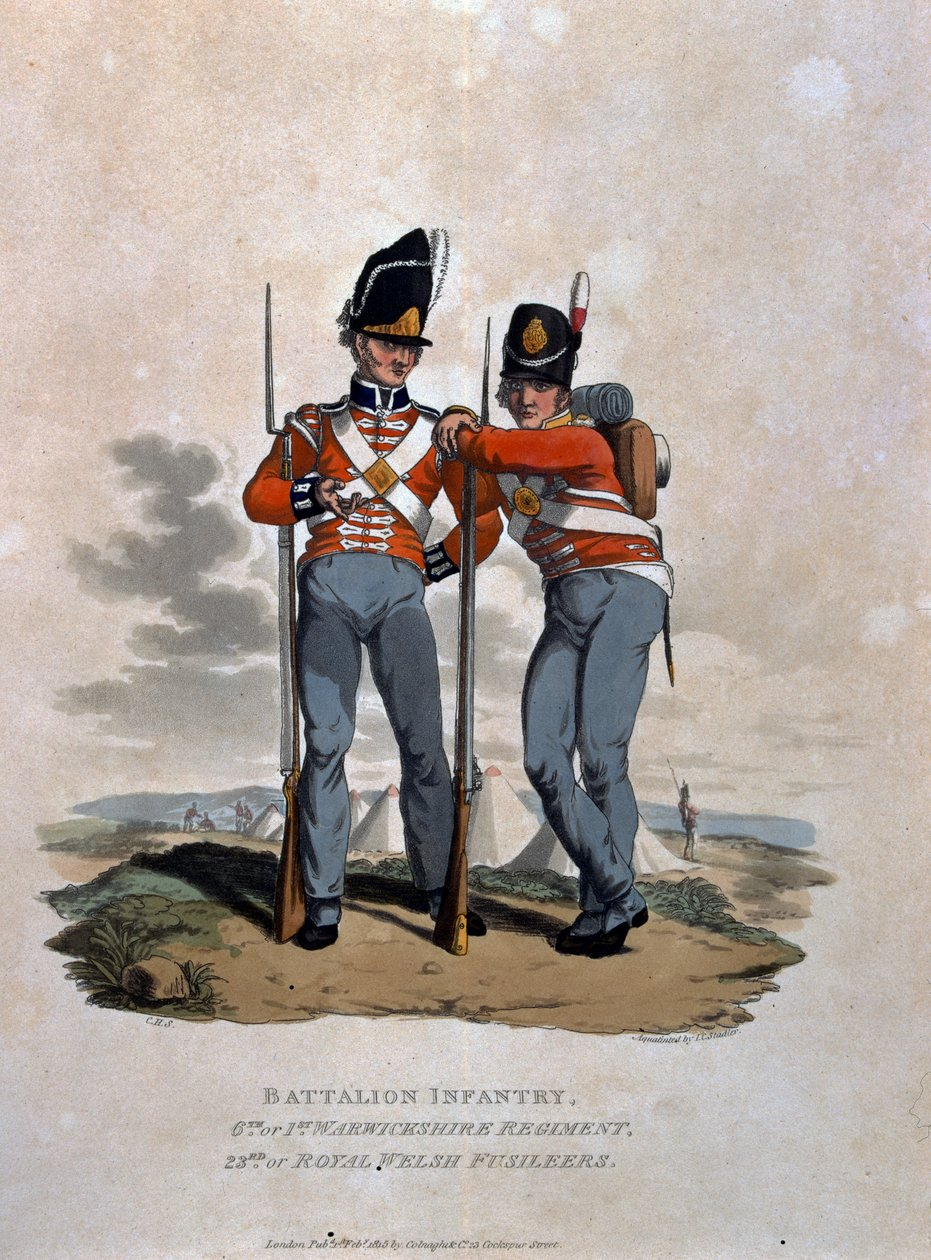
1815 engraving of a British grenadier (left) and line infantryman (right). Grenadiers were often taller than other soldiers.

Grenade usage declined in the 18th century, a fact that can be attributed to the improved effectiveness of infantry line tactics and flintlock technology. The need for elite assault troops remained, however, and the existing grenadier companies were used for this purpose. As noted, above average physical size had been considered important for the original grenadiers and, in principle, height and strength remained the basis of selection for these picked companies. In the British regiments of foot during the 18th century the preference was, however, to draw on steady veterans for appointment to individual vacancies in a grenadier company (one of the ten companies comprising each regiment). The traditional criterion of size was only resorted to when newly raised regiments required a quick sorting of a mass of new recruits. Prior to the Battle of Culloden in 1745 the Duke of Cumberland ordered that grenadier companies were "to be completed out of the best men of their respective Regiments, and to be constantly kept so".

By contrast, French grenadier companies of the 18th century appear to have selected their new recruits according to the classic criteria of height. However with the outbreak of the Revolutionary Wars the urgency of mass mobilisation meant that the selection of grenadier and other special sub-units was done according to the preferences of individual officers.

Transferral to a grenadier company generally meant both enhanced status and an increase in pay.

Whether for reasons of appearance or reputation, grenadiers tended to be the showpiece troops of their respective armies. In the Spanish Army of the early 19th century, for example, grenadier companies were excused routine duties such as town patrols but were expected to provide guards at the headquarters and residences of senior officers. When a regiment was in line formation the grenadier company always formed on the right flank. In the British Army, when Trooping the Colour, "The British Grenadiers" march is played no matter which regiment is on the parade ground, as the colour party stands at the right-hand end of the line, as every regiment formerly had a company of grenadiers at the right of their formation.

== Headgear ==
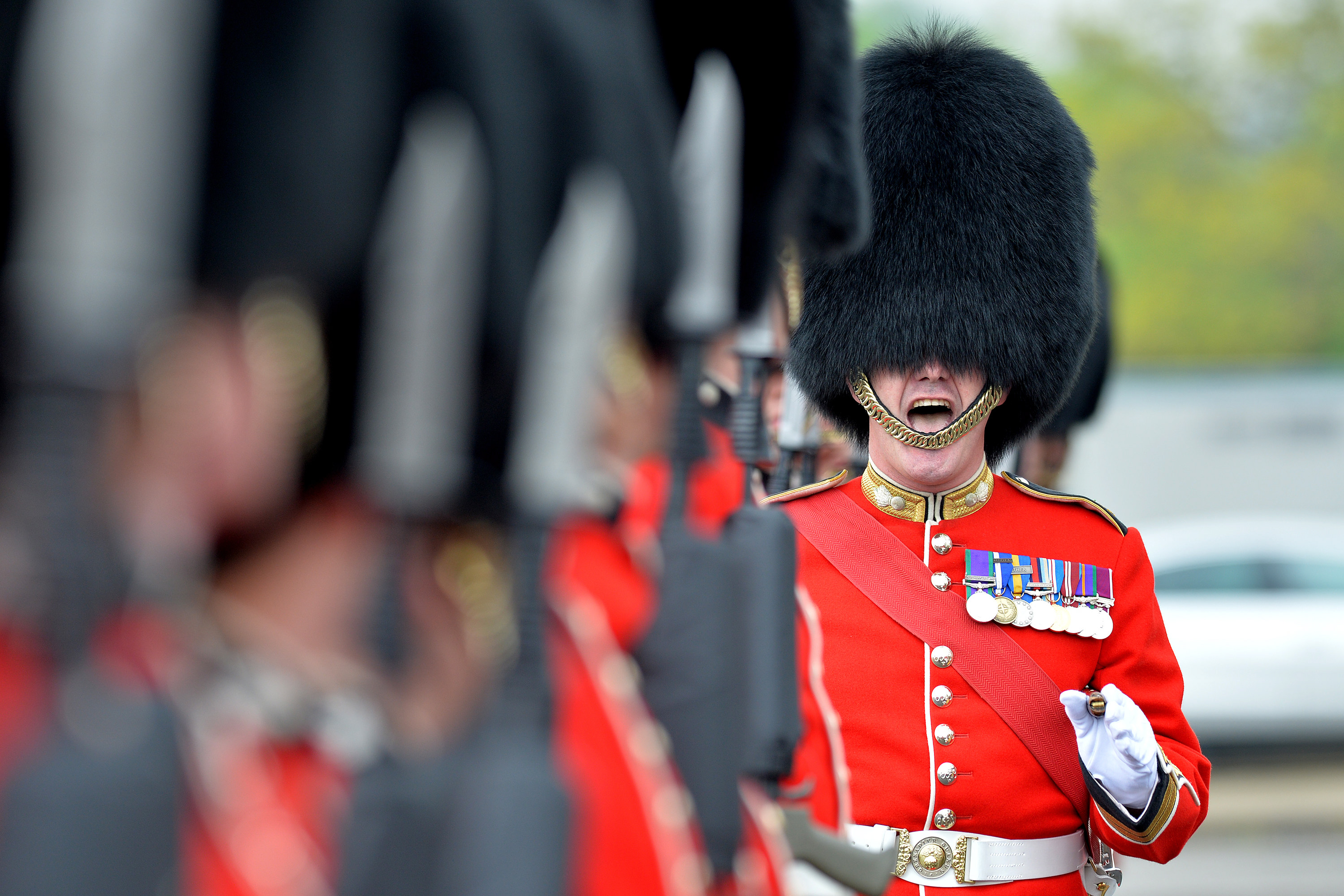
The British Army's Guards Division continue to wear the bearskin cap with its full dress uniform, a custom associated with the Grenadier Guards defeat of the French Imperial Guard in 1815.

As noted above, grenadiers were distinguished by their headgear from the ordinary musketeers (or Hatmen) in each regiment of foot. While there were some exceptions, the most typical grenadier headdress was either the mitre cap or the bearskin. Both began to appear in various armies during the second half of the 17th century because grenadiers were impeded by the wide brimmed infantry hats of the period when slinging their firearms while throwing grenades.

The cloth caps worn by the original grenadiers in European armies during the 17th century were frequently trimmed with fur. This fell out of fashion in many armies until the mid-18th century when grenadiers in the British, Spanish and French armies began wearing high fur-trimmed caps with crowns of coloured cloth and, in some cases, ornamental front plates. This added to the apparent height and impressive appearance of these troops both on the parade ground and the battlefield.

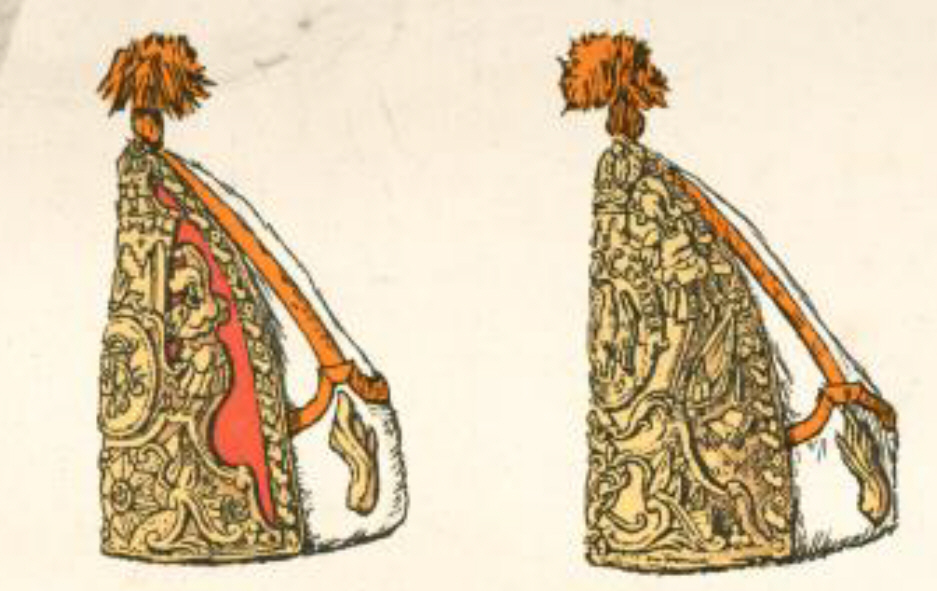
18th century Prussian grenadier mitre caps (Grenadiermütze).

The mitre cap, whether in stiffened cloth or metal, had become the distinguishing feature of the grenadier in the armies of Britain, Russia, Prussia and most German states during the late 17th and early 18th centuries. Spanish and Austrian grenadiers favoured high fur hats with long coloured cloth 'hoods' ("bags"). The mitre was gradually replaced by bearskin caps in other armies, and by 1914 it only survived in the 1st Foot Guards and the 1st (Emperor Alexander) Guards Grenadiers of the Prussian Imperial Guard, plus the Russian Pavlovsky Guard. Russian grenadiers had worn their brass fronted mitre hats on active service until 1807 and some of these preserved for parade wear by the Pavlovsky Guards until 1914 still had dents or holes from musket balls. Some have survived for display in museums and collections.

While Northern European armies such as Britain, Russia, Sweden, and various German states wore the mitre cap, southern countries such as France, Spain, Austria, Portugal, and various Italian states preferred the bearskin. By 1768, Britain had adopted the bearskin.

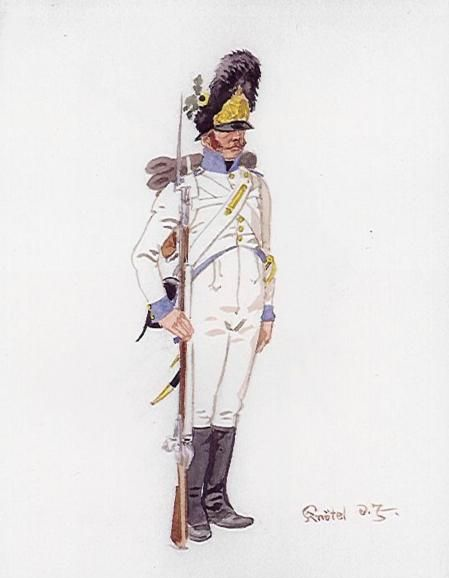
Austrian Deutschmeister grenadier in 1809

The shape and appearance of fur caps differed according to period and country. While France used smaller bearskins, Spain preferred towering caps with long flowing bags. Britain initially favoured tall cloth mitres with lacing and braiding, while Russia would sport equally tall leather helmets with brass front-plates. The first grenadier headdresses were fairly low, and in the case of Spain and Austria sometimes contained elements from both mitres and bearskins. Until the mid-18th century, French grenadiers wore tricorne hats, rather than either the mitre or fur cap. Grenadier caps gradually increased in size and decoration, with added devices such as pompoms, cords, badges, front-plates, plumes, and braiding, as well as various national heraldic emblems.

During the Napoleonic Wars, both mitres and fur caps fell out of use in favour of the shako. Two notable exceptions were the grenadier companies and Imperial Guard regiments of the French Grande Armée, plus those of the Austrian Army. After the Battle of Friedland in 1807, because of their distinguished performance, Russia's Pavlovsk Regiment were allowed to keep their mitre caps and were admitted to the Imperial Guard.

During the Napoleonic Wars, British grenadiers had usually worn the bearskin cap only for full dress when on home service, since the fur was found to deteriorate rapidly during campaigning overseas. Following their role in the defeat of the French Imperial Guard at the Battle of Waterloo, the 1st Foot Guards was renamed the 1st (or Grenadier) Regiment of Foot Guards and all companies of the regiment adopted the bearskin. In 1831, it was ordered that all three Foot Guards should wear the bearskin cap, by then resembling the modern headdress in shape and size. The grenadier companies of line infantry regiments meanwhile retained the bearskin cap for parade dress until it was abolished in 1842. During the Crimean War, the Foot Guard regiments wore their bearskins in the field, the only time the celebrated Guards' headdress was worn in action.

== Grenadier companies ==
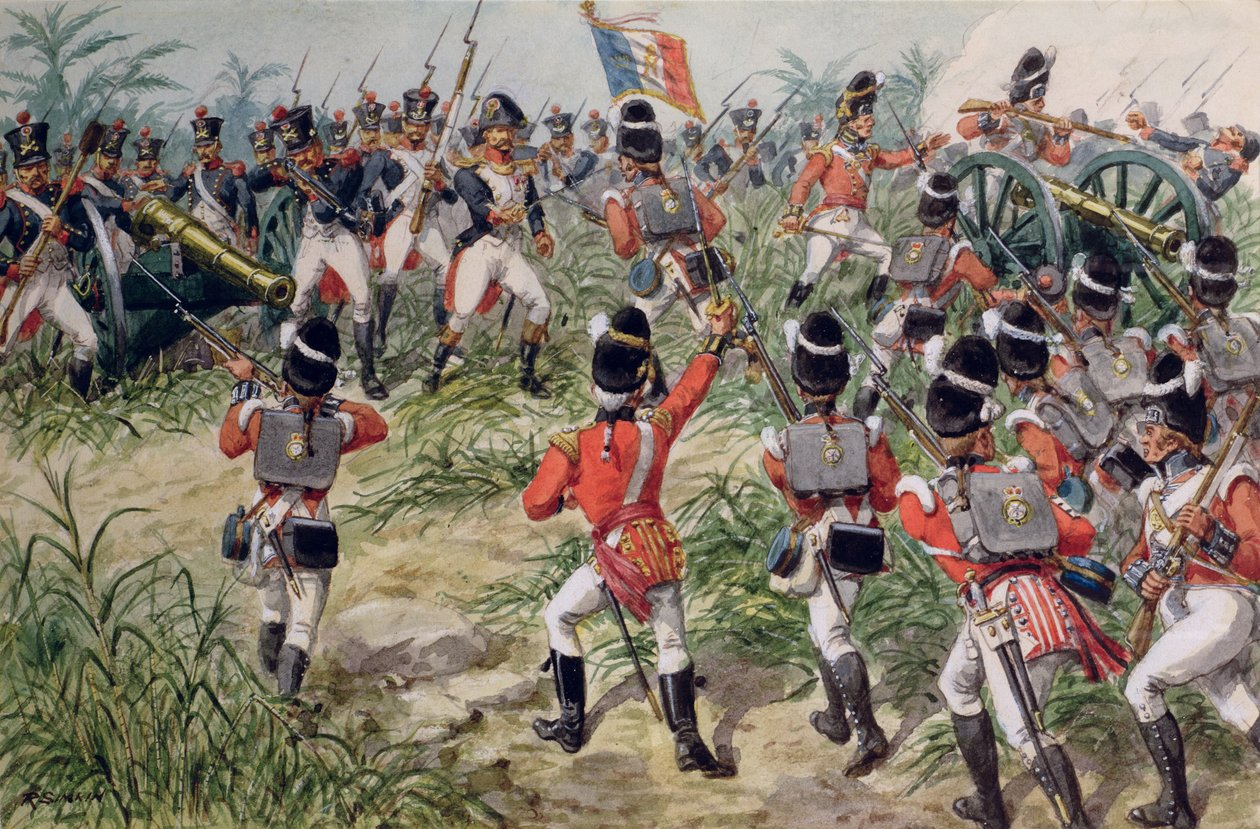
The 7th Foot's grenadier company during the British invasion of Martinique in 1809

From the 17th Century to the mid 19th centuries the "Foot" or infantry regiments of the British and several other armies comprised ten companies; eight of them "Battalion" or "Centre" companies, and two "Flank Companies" consisting of one Grenadier and one Light or Light Infantry Company. In the United States, an Act of Congress made on 8 May 1792 directed that for every infantry battalion there should be one company of grenadiers, riflemen, or light infantry.

On occasion the grenadier and light companies could be "brigaded" together into separate grenadier and light infantry battalions for assaults or skirmishing respectively. Each of the line infantry regiments of the Austrian Army of this period included a grenadier division of two companies, separate from the fusilier companies that made up the bulk of the unit. The grenadier companies were frequently detached from the parent regiment and grouped into composite grenadier battalions for a particular campaign or purpose.

The Russian Imperial Army of the 18th century followed a different line of development. Prior to 1731 grenadiers made up five separate regiments. These were disbanded prior to the outbreak of war with Turkey and picked infantrymen were transferred to one of two grenadier companies incorporated in each (two-battalion) line infantry regiment. In 1753, 2 grenadier companies were added to the infantry regiments and all regiments were ordered to consist of a 3-battalion structure, with 3 grenadier companies of 200 grenadiers in each. In 1756 each of the grenadier companies was brought together in four permanent grenadier regiments. This policy of maintaining a separate corps of grenadiers continued until the Russian Revolution of 1917. The Palace Grenadiers was a ceremonial company selected from distinguished veterans, in existence from 1827 to 1917 with the primary role of guarding the Winter Palace.

With the standardisation of training and tactics, the need for separate grenadier companies at regimental level had passed by the mid-19th century and the British, French and Austrian armies phased out these sub-units between 1850 and 1862.

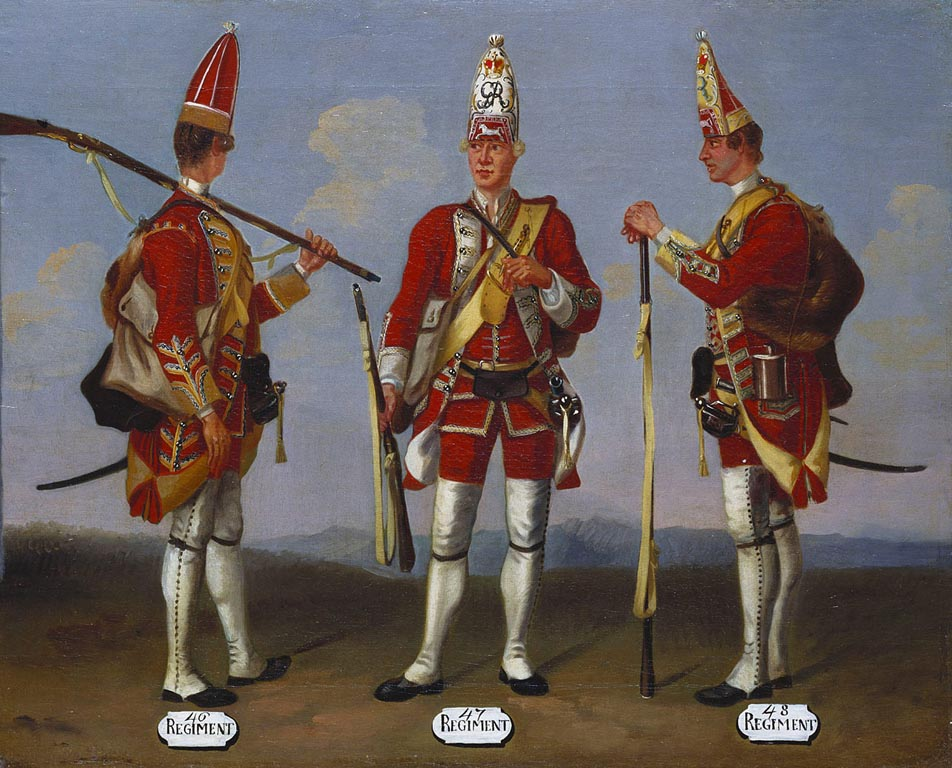
A representative panel of the Grenadier Paintings, depicting privates of the 46th, 47th and 48th Reg'ts. of Foot in route march order, by David Morier

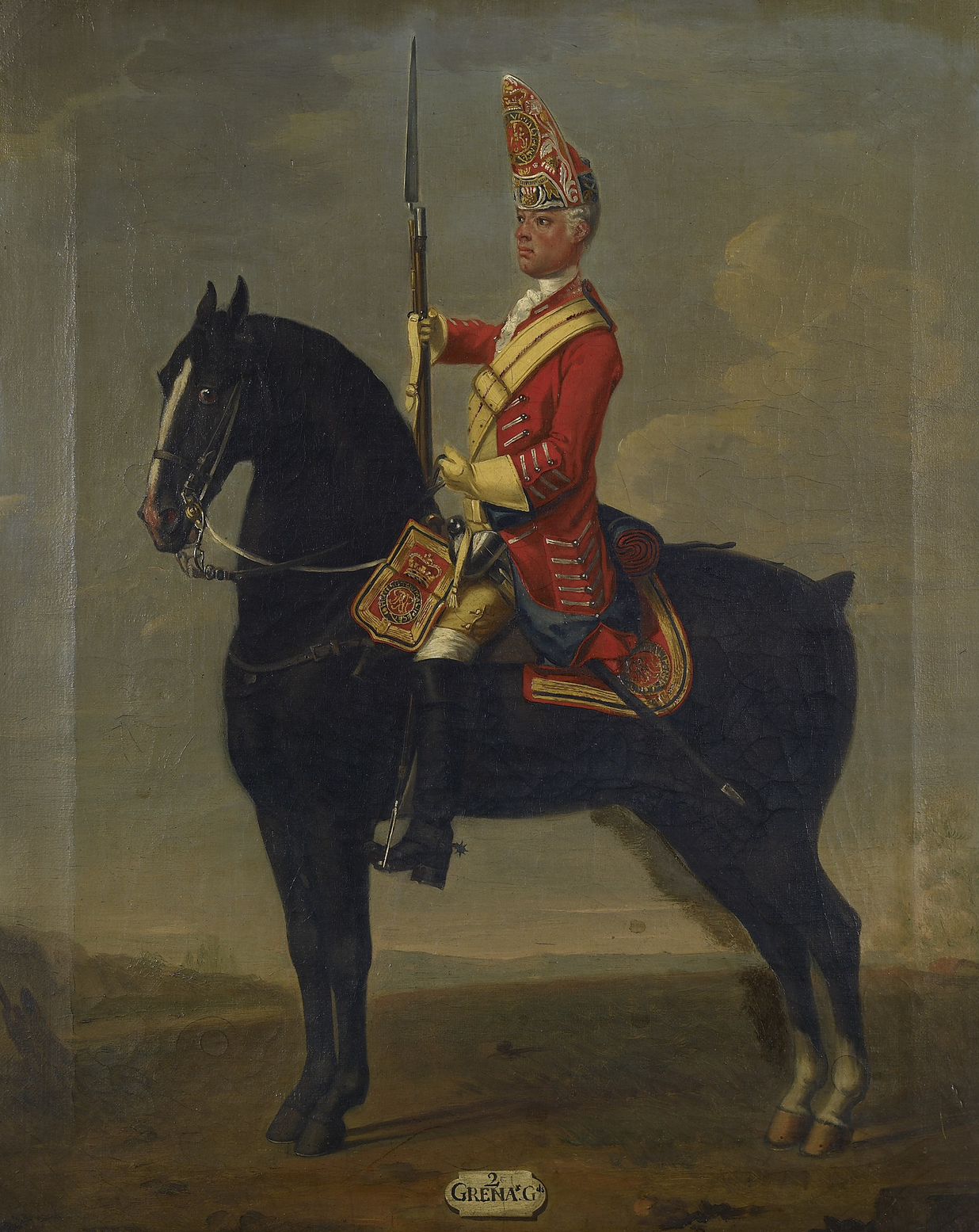
Trooper of the 2nd Reg't. of Horse Grenadiers, by David Morier

== Grenadier regiments ==
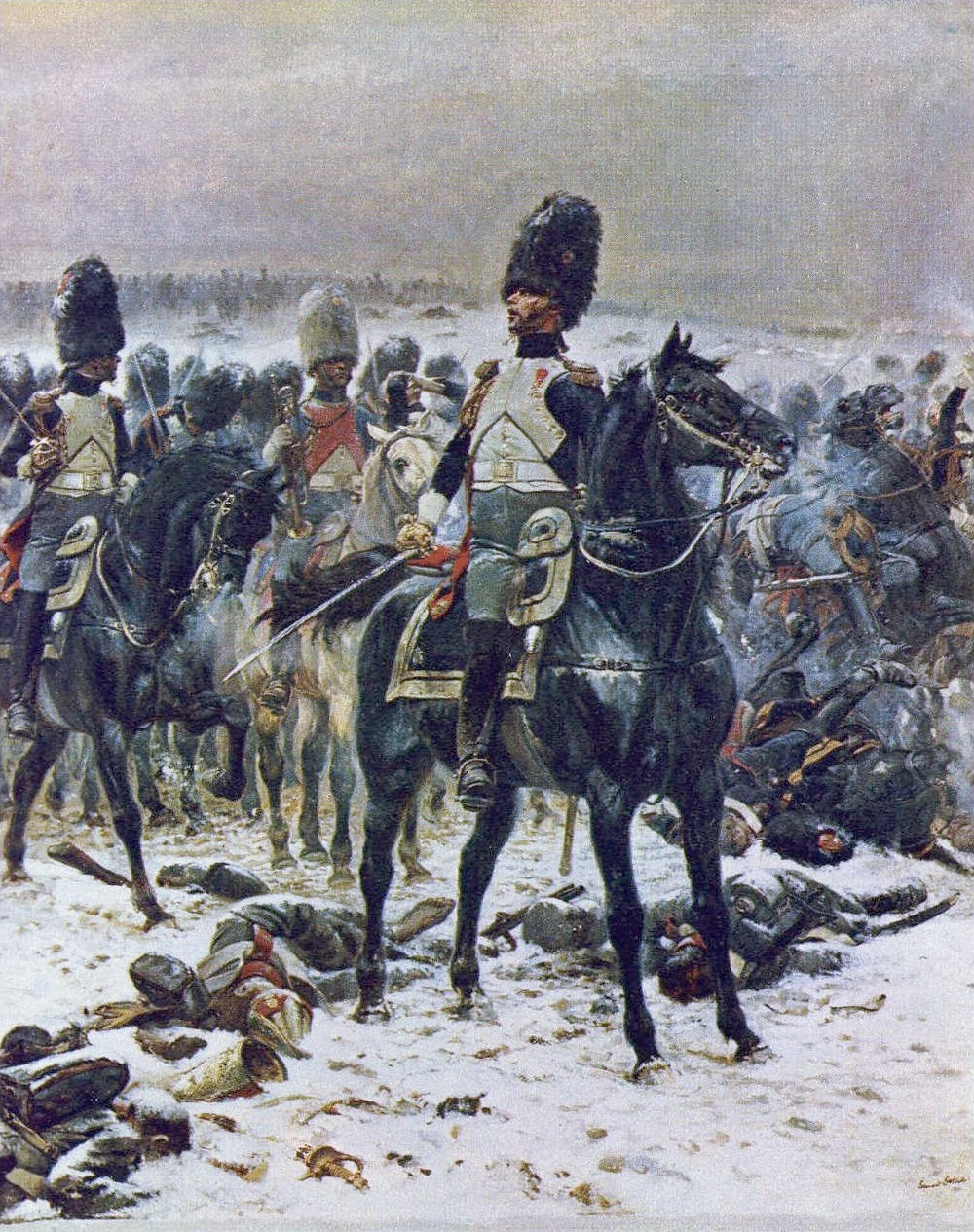
The Mounted Grenadiers of the Imperial Guard during the Battle of Eylau by Édouard Detaille.

The term grenadier was retained or adopted by various elite infantry units, including the Prussian Potsdam Grenadiers; the Granatieri di Sardegna (Grenadiers of Sardinia) in Italy; France's Foot Grenadiers, Fusilier-Grenadiers, Tirailleur-Grenadiers and Grenadiers à Cheval de la Garde Impériale; the Russian Empire's Imperial Guard; Britain's Grenadier Guards and the 101st Grenadiers. The latter was part of the British Indian Army and claimed to be the first and oldest grenadier regiment (as opposed to grenadier companies) in the British Empire. In 1747 the grenadier companies of a number of disbanded French infantry regiments were brought together to form a single permanent unit - the Grenadiers de France.

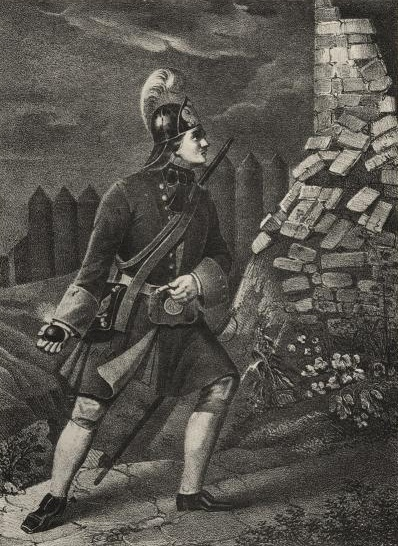
Russian grenadier from Preobrazhensky Life Guards Regiment, 18th century

During the American Revolution of 1775–1783, the Connecticut 1st Company Governor's Guards and the 11th Regiment of Connecticut Militia had grenadier companies. New York City also had a Grenadier unit, as did South Carolina – the elite 1st South Carolina Regiment, raised and commanded by Charles Cotesworth Pinckney.

In Mexico Antonio López de Santa Anna created the Grenadier Guards of the Supreme Power on 7 December 1841. The formation remained in service until 1847.

A Toronto militia unit was renamed the 10th Royal Grenadiers in 1881, then later became the Royal Regiment of Canada.

== Grenadier divisions ==
In the nineteenth century, France had the Oudinot Grenadier Division and the Russian army had grenadier divisions such as the Caucasus Grenadier Division. During World War II, the Polish army had the 1st Grenadier Division and in 1942 the German military renamed their riflemen as grenadier divisions while mechanized and motorized riflemen units were renamed to panzergrenadier divisions. There were also many Volksgrenadier divisions.

== World War I and beyond ==
In 1914, the Imperial German and Russian Armies still included a number of grenadier regiments. In the Russian Army, these comprised the Grenadier Guards Regiment (L-G Grenadierski Polk) as well as the Grenadier Corps of sixteen regiments. Finally a reinforced company of distinguished veterans, designated as Palace Grenadiers, was retained for ceremonial purposes, guarding the St. Petersburg Imperial residences and various monuments.

Five regiments of the Prussian Guard were designated as Garde-Grenadiers and there were an additional fourteen regiment of grenadiers amongst the line infantry of the German Empire. In both the Russian and German armies, the grenadier regiments were considered as a historic elite; distinguished by features such as plumed helmets in full dress, distinctive facings (yellow for all Russian grenadiers) or special braiding. Their role and training, however, no longer differed from that of the rest of the infantry.

Today, regiments using the name grenadiers are effectively indistinguishable from other infantry, especially when hand grenades, RPGs, and other types of explosive arms have become standard-issue weaponry; however, such regiments retain at least the tradition of their elite past. Grenadier can also refer to soldiers using grenade launchers, including those mounted on rifles. During World War I a proposal to designate specialist grenade launching units in the British Army as grenadiers was vetoed by the Grenadier Guards, who considered that they now had exclusive rights to the ancient distinction, and the term "bomber" was substituted.

During World War I, German troops referred to as assault pioneers, who were early combat engineers or sappers and stormtroopers began using two types of hand grenades in trench warfare operations against the French to clear opposing trenches of troops. The more effective of the two was the so-called "potato masher" Stielhandgranate, which were stick grenades.

The term Panzergrenadier was adopted in the German Wehrmacht to describe mechanized heavy infantry elements whose greater protection and mobility allowed them to keep pace with (and provide intimate protection to) armoured units and formations. This designation reflects the traditional role of grenadiers as shock troops. The term in today's Bundeswehr refer to mechanized infantry.

When parachute units were first created in the United States Army, the Air Corps desired them to be under their control and to be designated "air grenadiers".

The last known unit to serve as grenadiers, and employing grenades as their weapons, was a special "Grenadier brigade" formed by the Red Army within the 4th Army during the Tikhvin defensive operation in October 1941. It was a measure taken because of lack of firearms, and the commander of the brigade was appropriately General Major G.T. Timofeyev who had served in one of the Russian Imperial Army's grenadier regiments during the First World War.

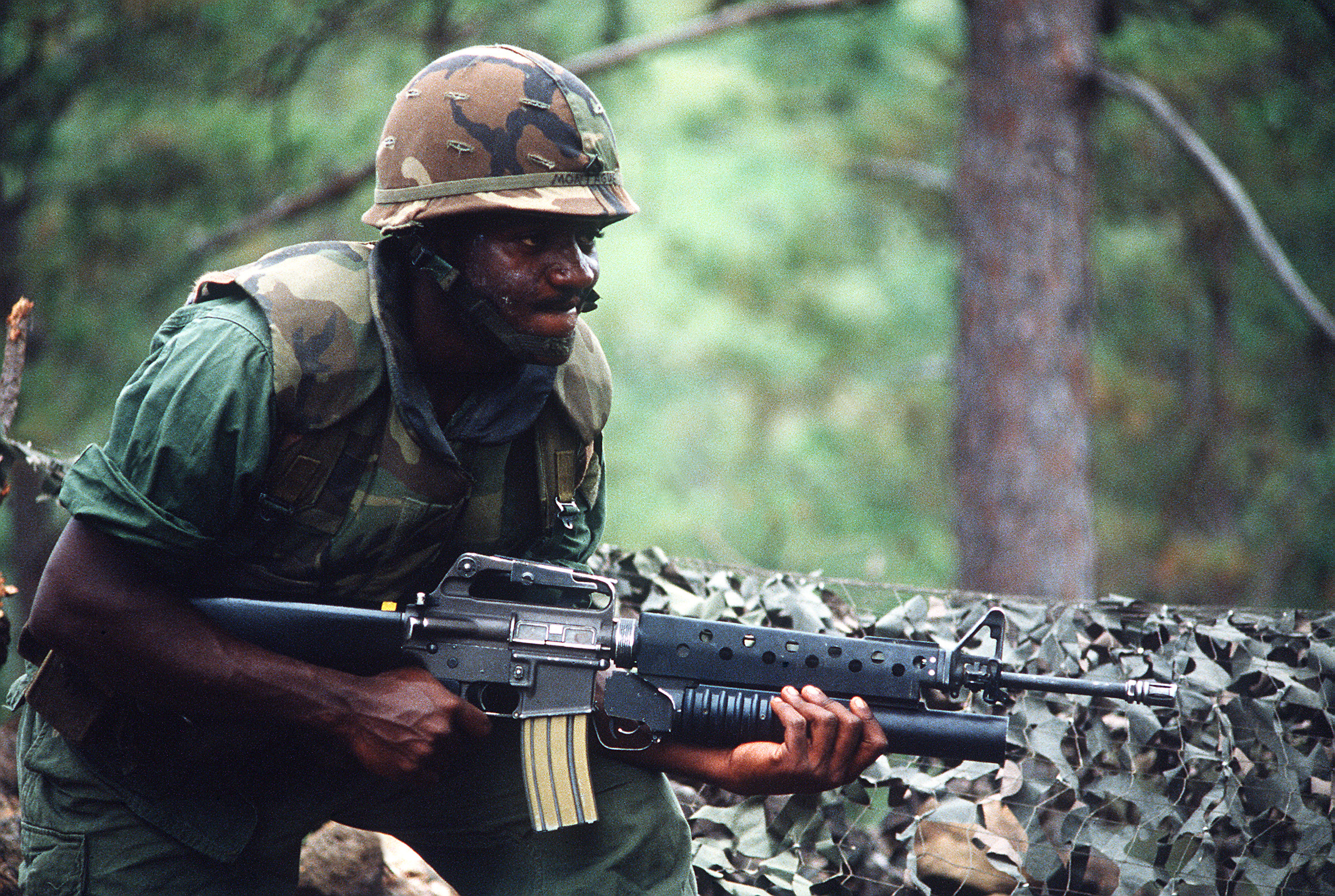
A United States Army grenadier armed with an M16A1 equipped with an M203 grenade launcher in 1984. In most modern militaries, grenadiers are usually armed with standalone or underbarrel grenade launchers.

In the Vietnam War, U.S. squads usually had at least one soldier whose role was that of a grenadier, armed with just an M79 grenade launcher and an M1911 pistol, though in some cases grenadiers were not even issued this sidearm. The M79 was designed to bridge the gap between the maximum throwing range of a grenade and the minimum distance of mortar fire. The XM148 grenade launcher, the M79's replacement designed to be mounted to the M16 rifle, was first issued in December 1966, but was beset by problems: the cocking mechanism was difficult to squeeze, the sight was hard to use, and the complicated trigger design required constant maintenance. By May 1967, it was deemed unsuitable for use in the field, and was eventually replaced by the M203 grenade launcher. Though the M203 was later replaced by the M320 Grenade Launcher Module in U.S. Army service starting in 2009, the M203 remains a popular and familiar choice in the grenadier role and is still issued by other U.S. military branches.

=== Argentina ===
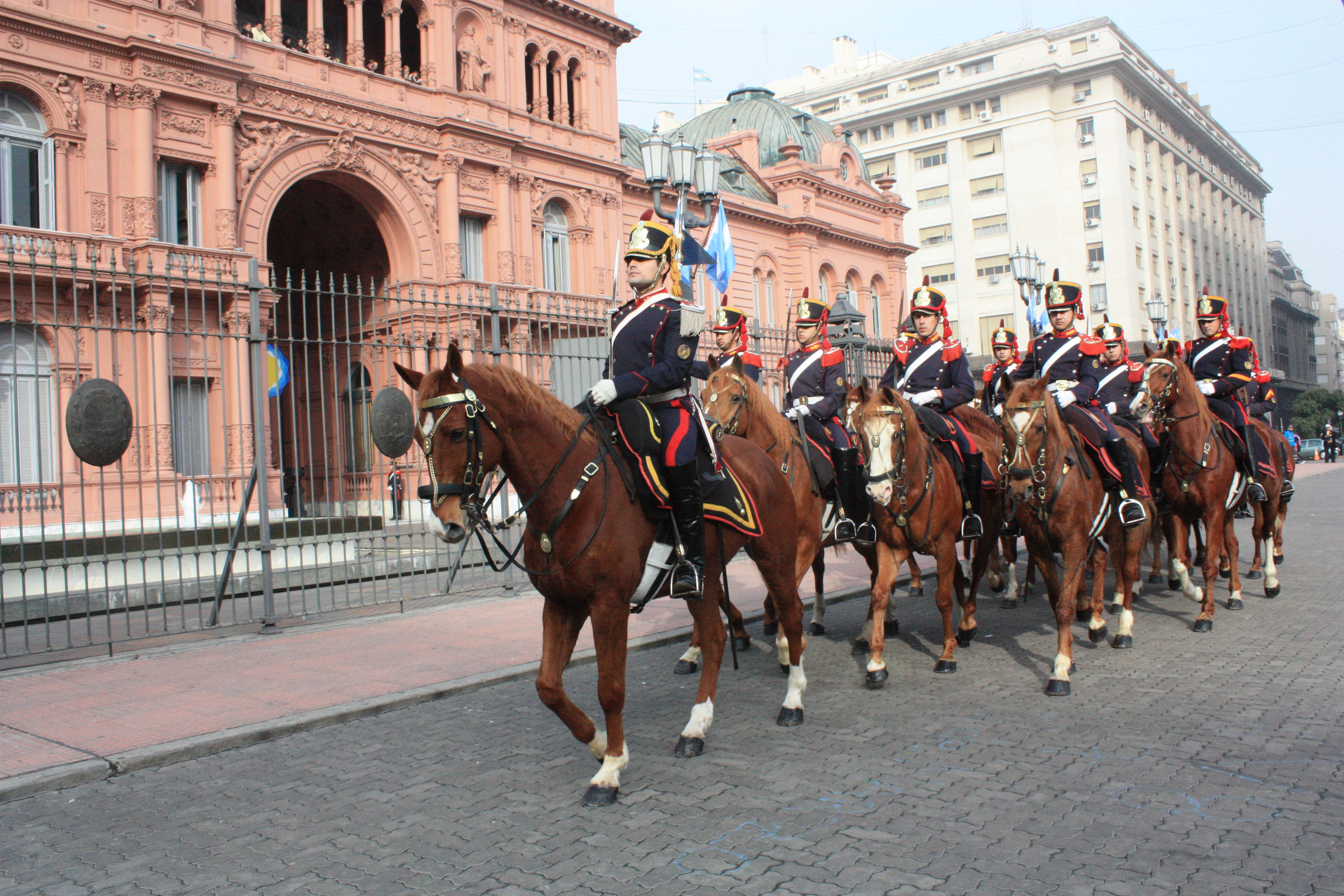
The Regiment of Mounted Grenadiers of the Argentine Army. Unlike most other units that carried the title of grenadiers, the Mounted Grenadiers were a cavalry unit.

The Argentine Army still maintains a prestigious unit known as the Regiment of Mounted Grenadiers (Regimiento de Granaderos a Caballo)--actually a squadron-strength formation—which serves as the Presidential ceremonial escort and guard unit. The regiment was founded in 1903 as a recreation of a unit that existed from 1813 to 1826 under the leadership of national hero General José de San Martín.

Unlike most other units that carried the title of "grenadiers", the Argentine Grenadiers are a cavalry unit, and continue to mount horses for ceremonial purposes, as well as carrying lances and cavalry sabers.

=== Belgium ===
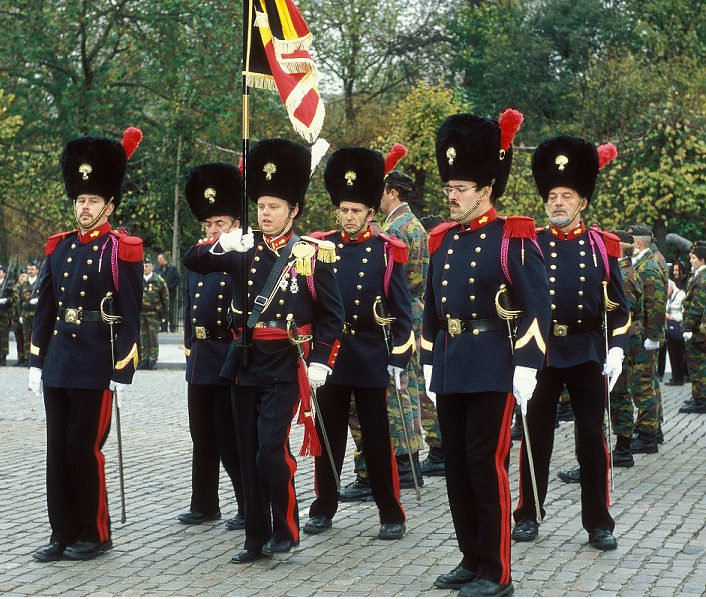
Modern Belgian Grenadiers in pre-1914 full dress

The Belgian Land Component retains two regiments of grenadiers based in Brussels. First raised in 1837 from companies drawn from the line infantry of the newly independent kingdom, these troops served with distinction in both World Wars. In peacetime they had a ceremonial role that corresponded to that of royal guards in other armies. In 1960 the historic blue and red full dress worn prior to World War I was reintroduced for limited wear, although the tall bearskin headdress is now made of synthetic material.

=== Canada ===
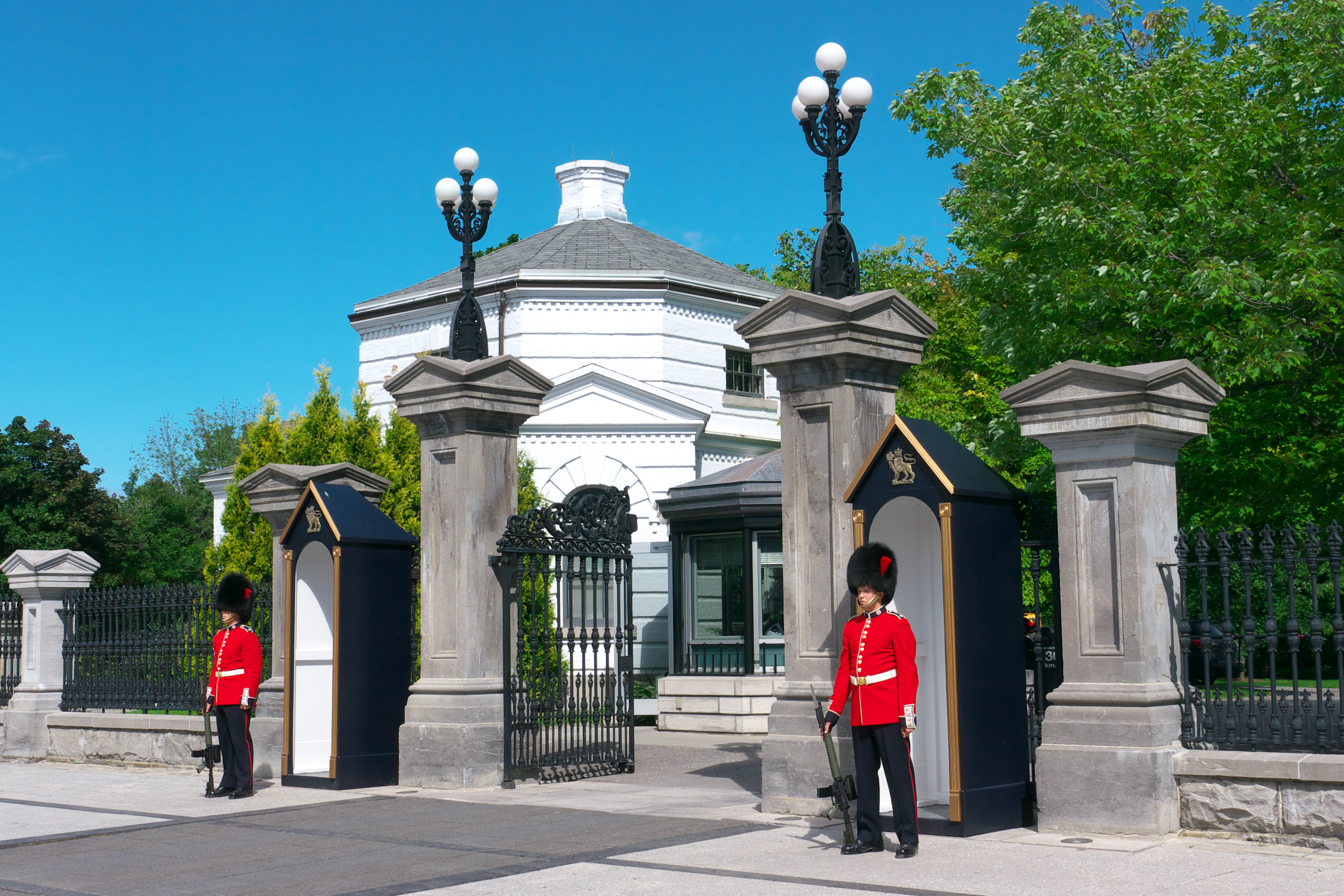
Canadian Grenadier Guards in full dress guarding the main gate to Rideau Hall, the official residence for the Canadian monarch.

The Canadian Grenadier Guards is one of the longest serving units in the Canadian Army's Primary Reserve. It still continues today, both in its reserve role and as a ceremonial guard at the National War Memorial, Rideau Hall, and other places of symbolic importance.

The 10th Royal Grenadiers (later The Royal Grenadiers) of Toronto later became the Royal Regiment of Canada with tradition surviving in a grenadier company.

The Winnipeg Grenadiers was one of the two Canadian infantry regiments of C Force that took part in the Battle of Hong Kong in December 1941. The regiment is currently on the Supplementary Order of Battle.

=== Chile ===
The Presidential Horse Guards Cavalry Regiment "Grenadiers" (Regimiento Escolta Presidencial n.1 "Granaderos") of the Chilean Army is active since 1827, has fought in every major battle of the Chilean Army in the 19th century and since 1840 and 1907 has served as the Escort Regiment to the President of Chile on important national occasions. This regiment is named after General Manuel Bulnes Prieto, the founding patron of the regiment, who led the Chilean Army and the anti-confederation North Peruvian dissidents to victory in the War of the Peru-Bolivia Confederation in the crucial Battle of Yungay in 1839, which signaled the confederation's demise.

The Chilean Grenadiers' uniforms, until 2011, were similar to the full Feldgrau uniforms of the Chilean Army, but adapted for the cavalry and like their Argentine counterparts, carry lances but not cavalry sabers, which are reserved for officers and the mounted colors guard escort. Starting in 2011, the regiment now wears a cavalry light blue full dress uniform with Pickelhaubes for all ranks.

=== Ecuador ===
The "Tarqui Grenadiers" serve as the Presidential Escort Squadron for the President of Ecuador. The unit stands guard at Quito's Carondelet Palace and retains the uniform worn during the Battle of Tarqui of 1829, reporting as part of the Ecuadorian Army.

=== France ===
While the French army has not included any grenadiers since 1870, the grenade badge is still a distinctive mark of the Foreign Legion, the National Gendarmerie and the French Customs, which was a military unit until 1940.

=== Germany ===
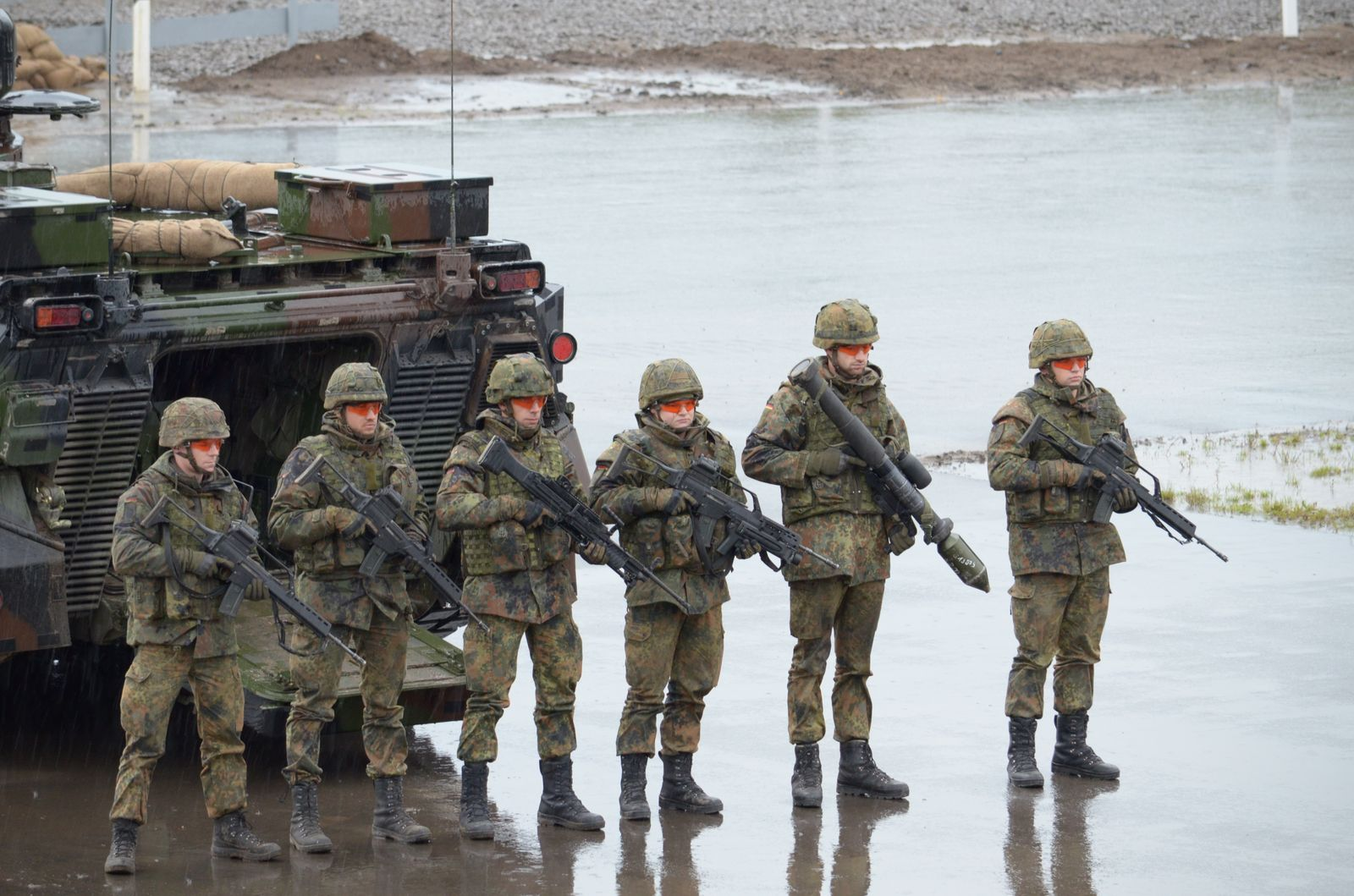
A Panzergrenadier squad of the German Heer. A Panzergrenadier is the lowest rank of the German mechanized infantry.

- Grenadier is the lowest rank (OR-1) in the Heeresteil (en: army part) of the Bundeswehr Wachbataillon (en: Bundeswehr guard battalion).
- Furthermore, in the German Heer Panzergrenadier (en: armoured grenadier) is the lowest rank (OR-1) of the Panzergrenadieretruppe (en: mechanized infantry).

=== India ===
The oldest grenadier regiment of the armies in the Commonwealth belongs to the Indian Army. The concept of 'Grenadiers' evolved from the practice of selecting the bravest and strongest men for the most dangerous tasks in combat. The Grenadiers have the longest unbroken record of existence in the Indian Army.

=== Italy ===
The Granatieri di Sardegna Mechanized Brigade (Reggimento Granatieri di Sardegna) is currently part of the mechanized infantry brigade with the same name in the Italian Army. This unit traces its history back to a guards regiment raised in 1659 and is made up predominantly of one year volunteers. Historically, as the senior regiment in the Piedmontese and Italian armies the Grenadiers of Sardinia took the tallest recruits of each intake. On ceremonial occasions the Italian Grenadiers parade in their 19th century blue uniforms and fur headdresses. The 1st Grenadiers of Sardinia regiment is currently (2010) the only infantry regiment of the Italian Army with two battalions (1st "Assietta" and 2nd "Cengio" Grenadiers battalions), and it is likely that in 2020 its 2nd Battalion will be detached to re-activate the 2nd Sardinia Grenadiers Regiment.

=== Mexico ===
In Mexico, Grenadiers (Granaderos) are armored specialist police units used for anti-riot duties and other security roles. The National Guard maintains regional grenadier companies for public security duties, while performing law enforcement and wearing NG uniforms.

=== Netherlands ===
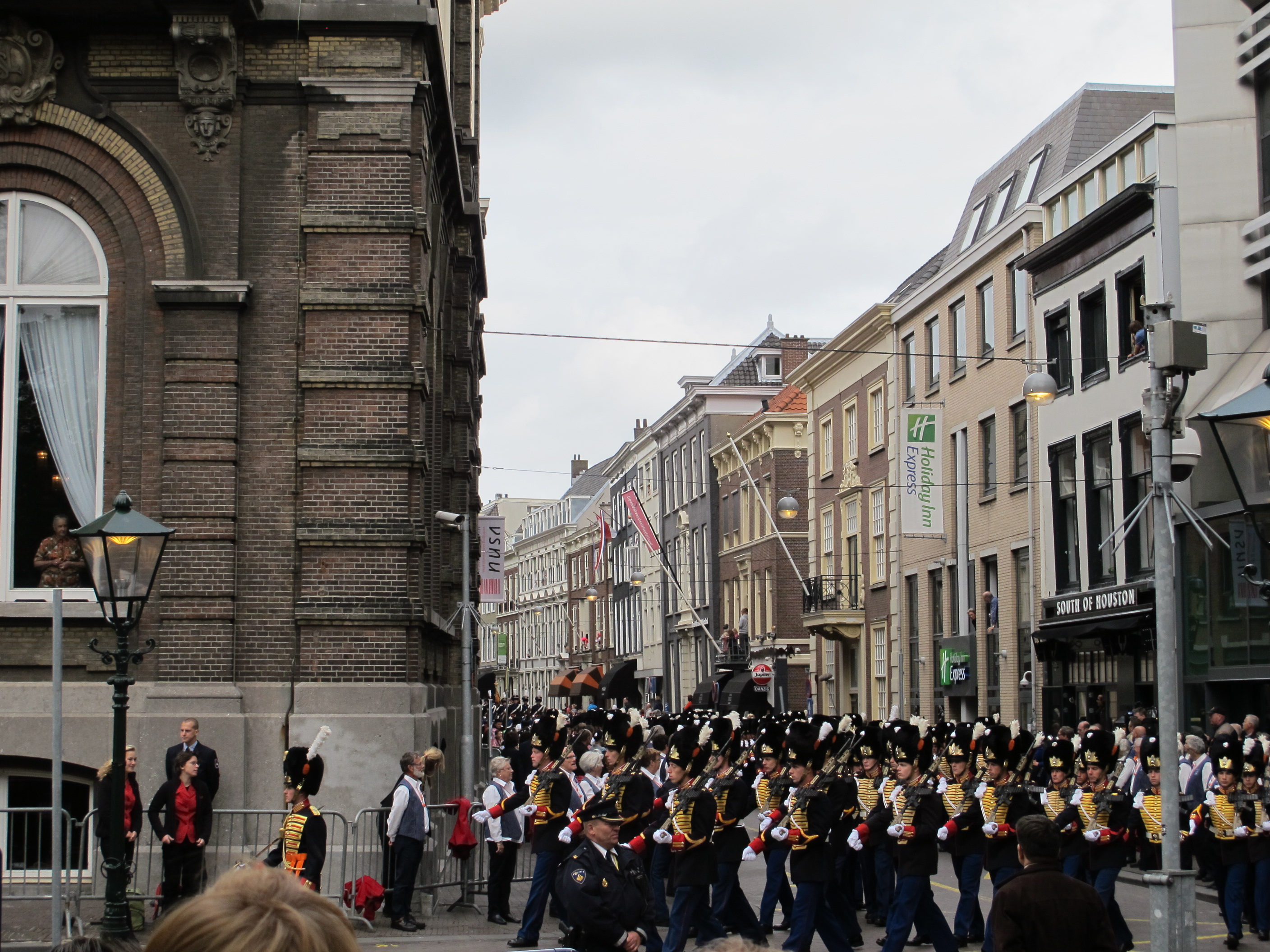
The Netherlander Grenadiers' and Rifles Guard Regiment was the amalgamation of the grenadiers guard regiment and the Jagers guard regiment.

The Royal Netherlands Army maintains a regiment of Guard Grenadiers who retain the bearskin headdress of the early 19th century. This regiment has been amalgamated with the Jager Guards to form the "Garderegiment Grenadiers en Jagers" Two of its companies are Jagers (riflemen), the other two are grenadiers; it wears the maroon beret and is an air assault and airborne forces trained unit.

=== Norway ===
In the Norwegian Army and Air Force, grenadier (Norwegian: grenader) is used as a rank, the lowest enlisted below sergeant, to distinguish professional soldiers from conscripts. The grenadiers are employed for positions requiring more experience and/or professional presence. Fully professionalised units, such as the Telemark Battalion, serve in international operations. Professional enlisted personnel in the Navy has the equivalent rank matros (able seaman).

=== Spain ===
There is one company of the 1st King's Immemorial Infantry Regiment, which during ceremonies, is authorized to use grenadier uniforms of the Charles III period.

=== Sweden ===
The Grenadier Company is the honor guard of the Swedish Army's Life Guards for state ceremonies. Their uniform includes bearskin hats, and white baldrics (cross belts) that originally carried the fuses used to light grenades. The grenadiers bear the King's own Life Company banner, which was presented to the unit in 1868 by Charles XV's consort, Queen Louise.

=== Switzerland ===
In the military of Switzerland, the Grenadiers form well trained mechanized infantry units. They are used for especially challenging operations and are initially trained in Isone, a secluded, mountainous region in the South of Switzerland. The Swiss Kommando Spezialkräfte specialize in urban warfare, guerrilla warfare, anti-terrorist operations, commando tactics, sniper missions, hand-to-hand combat, and other special operations.

=== United Kingdom ===
The Grenadier Guards are the most senior of the five prestigious regiments of Foot Guards, each of which retains the bearskin headdress originally associated with grenadiers.

Although the Coldstream Guards can trace their origins to an earlier date (1650) than that of the Grenadier Guards (1656), they are officially recognized as second in seniority since having been formed initially to serve the Commonwealth, their service to the Crown only dates from the Restoration of the Monarchy in 1660.

=== United States ===
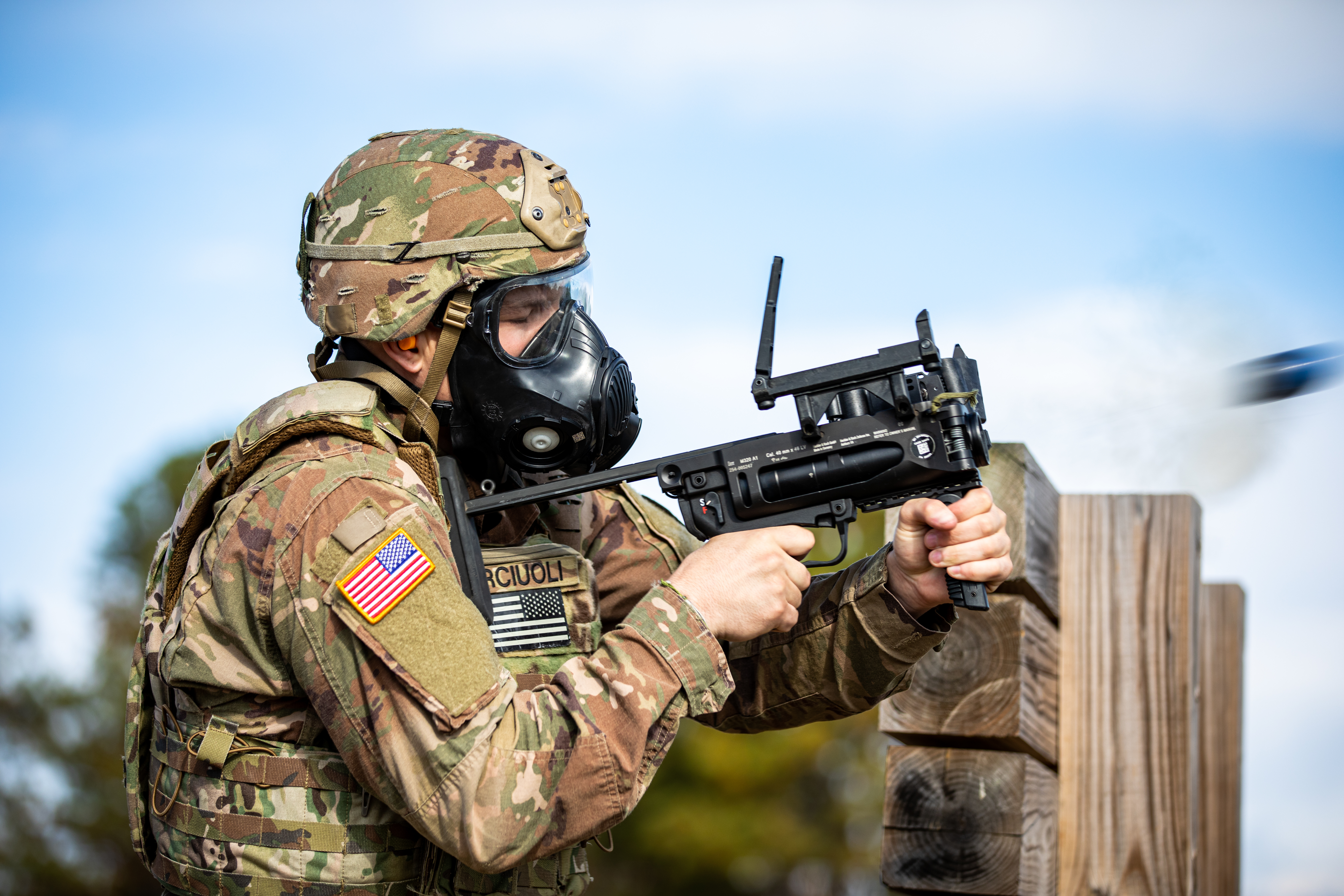
A U.S. Army National Guard grenadier firing an M320 Grenade Launcher Module

The United States Army rifle squad consists of two fireteams of four soldiers each, with the designated grenadier being equipped with an M4/M16 with the M203 grenade launcher (or newer M320 Grenade Launcher Module) slung under the barrel and providing limited high-angle fire over 'dead space'.

The United States Marine Corps rifle squad consists of three four-man fireteams including a designated grenadier who works either the M320 grenade launcher module or the M-32 module grenade launcher. During the Vietnam War there was one grenadier in the squad armed with an M79 grenade launcher.

=== Yugoslavia ===
Bombaši (Serbian Cyrillic: бомбаши; "bombardiers" or "bombers") is the name widely used for the Yugoslav Partisan volunteer grenadiers, who had a significant importance in operations during World War II and are regarded as particularly heroic.

== Sources ==
- Gudmundsson, Bruce I., Hyland, William, Stormtroop Tactics: Innovation in the German Army, 1914-1918, Greenwood Publishing Group, Incorporated, 1995
- Velichko, Konstantin; Novitsky, Vasily; Schwartz, Alexey von; Apushkin, Vladimir; Schoultz, Gustav von (1912). "Гренадеры" [Grenadiers]. Sytin Military Encyclopedia (in Russian). Vol. VIII: Гимры – Двигатели судовые. Moscow: Типография Т-ва И. Д. Сытина.
