= 1st Grenadier Division =

- Memorial badge of the division, featuring the Cross of Lorraine
- Active: 1939-1940
- Country: Poland
- Branch: Land forces
- Type: Motorized infantry
- Size: 16,180 soldiers and officers
- Engagements: Battle of Lagarde, Maginot Line

Commanders
- Notable commanders: Bronisław Duch

The 1st Grenadier Division (French: 1ère Division des Grenadiers; Polish: 1. Dywizja Grenadierów) was a Polish infantry formation raised in France during the Phoney War. The division was created as a part of the Polish Army in France following the Invasion of Poland. The division fought in the Battle of France in 1940.

== Formation ==
Due to the Franco-Polish alliance, the formation of a Polish division in France began in early September 1939, shortly after the Invasion of Poland. The French government gave over a military camp at Coëtquidan to the Polish military mission and permitted voluntary recruitment from the Poles in France, which were particularly numerous in the coal-producing regions of Flanders. After the fall of Poland and the formation of the Polish government-in-exile, the newly appointed Polish commander-in-chief Władysław Sikorski ordered the formation of the 1st Grenadier Division on 13 November 1939.

Initially commanded by Colonel Stanisław Maczek, the division was taken over by Colonel Bolesław Bronisław Duch in January 1940. It was organized according to the French model and was equipped with French weapons and uniforms. Altogether, the formation numbered eventually about 13,000 enlisted soldiers, 2,600 NCOs and 580 officers of all grades, when it was sworn in by Gen. Sikorski on 25 May 1940, shortly before arriving at the front in Lorraine.

== Battle of France ==
At the end of April 1940, the division was moved to Colombey-les-Belles in Lorraine where it received its long-awaited heavy equipment and final training. On 18 May the formation was moved to the Sarre area and was part of the French 4th Army, 20th Army Corps. 1st Regiment under Colonel Lowczowski was assigned to defend the Maginot Line near Wittlesburg. Initially divided between the two units of the Corps, the French 52nd Infantry Division and the Fortified Sector of the Sarre, the division operated in a supporting role.

=== June 1940 ===
The division first saw combat on 14 June 1940, when attacked by German forces. The following day the division was centred and successfully defended its positions. However, during the night the 52nd Division broke down and withdrew soon after it was attacked to Dieuze. Fearing his corps being cut in two, the formation commander ordered the Poles to withdraw to the second line of defences. It withdrew to the area of Dieuze, where it covered the retreat of the French division throughout 16 June. The following night it successfully disengaged itself and withdrew to the Marne–Rhine Canal defensive line, where it covered the area around Lagarde. As a result of the two-day-long Battle of Lagarde, the division was heavily damaged but managed to hold its positions. However, the 52nd Division had been destroyed by the Wehrmacht and the corps' remainder was disbanded by its commanding officer.

The 20th Army Corps' remnants, then composed mostly of the Polish division and a small detachment of the Fortified Sector of the Sarre, withdrew to the forests around Baccarat. There it formed a perimeter defence in and around the town of Meriller. Not attacked directly, the 20th Army Corps was surrounded by the enemy on 19 June. The Poles broke through to Neureville but were unable to continue their assault. On 21 June, after receiving information of Franco-German capitulation talks, Gen. Bronisław Duch disbanded the unit and ordered his men to either flee to neutral Switzerland or to join the Polish forces in the United Kingdom. Many chose the latter option, including the general himself.

Altogether, the division lost approximately 5,200 men during the Battle of France.

== Composition ==
- 1st Warsaw Grenadier Regiment
- 2nd Wielkopolska Grenadier Regiment
- 3rd Silesian Grenadier Regiment
- 8th Uhlan Regiment
- 1st Wilno Light Artillery Regiment
- 1st Pomeranian Heavy Artillery Regiment
- 1st Modlin Engineer battalion
- 1st Gdańsk Signals battalion

== Equipment ==
- 12,000 rifles
- 336 light machine guns
- 176 heavy machine guns
- 27 × 60 mm (2.4 in) mortars
- 24 × 81 mm (3 in) mortars
- 54 × 25 mm (1 in) anti-tank guns
- 8 × 47 mm (2 in) anti-tank guns
- 36 × 75 mm (3 in) field guns
- 24 × 155 mm (6 in) howitzers
- 560 automobiles and trucks
- 1,600 horse-drawn vehicles
