= Battle of Lagarde (1940) =

1940 World War II battle

- Part of Battle of France of World War II
Date	17–18 June 1940
Location	Near Lagarde, Moselle, France
Result	German victory

Belligerents
Germany	Poland

Commanders and leaders
Wilhelm List	Bronislaw Duch

Units involved
12th Army Corps	1st Grenadiers Division

Strength
Unknown	Unknown

Casualties and losses
Unknown	Unknown

The Battle of Lagarde took place on 17–18 June 1940, during the German Invasion of France. The Polish 1st Grenadiers Division, commanded by General Bronislaw Duch, clashed with units of German 12th Army Corps. The battle took place near Lagarde, Moselle.

On 15–16 June 1940, the 1st Grenadiers Division, which was part of French 20th Army Corps, fought the advancing Wehrmacht near Dieuze. On 17 June it was ordered to keep the line of the Marne–Rhine Canal, between Lagarde and the Rechicourt Forest. On the same day, the first German units crossed the canal in the sector defended by the 2nd Grenadier Regiment, but were soon forced to abandon their positions. On 18 June Germans once again tried to cross the canal, but failed. At the same time, the German 79th Infantry Division broke the French defence of the 52nd Infantry Division, and the Polish formation was attacked from left wing.

In the afternoon of 18 June, Germans continued their advance. Polish grenadiers, who suffered heavy losses, reaching up to 50% of their manpower, were replaced by French units, and ordered to concentrate near Baccarat. Two days later, on 20 June, the Polish division took defensive positions along the Meurthe river, near Raon l'Etape. After French divisions, located in this area, had withdrawn, General Duch decided to dissolve his unit (21 June), sending a coded message "4444": "The end of hostilities, the Division is dissolved. Safeguard the documents and the flags, destroy the equipment, break into small groups and tried to get to southern France and then to Britain".

Altogether, the 1st Grenadiers Division lost 5200 soldiers in the French campaign.

On the 30th anniversary of the battle, a monument dedicated to the dead soldiers was unveiled in Lagarde. The battle is commemorated on the Tomb of the Unknown Soldier, Warsaw, with the inscription: "LEGARDE 17 – 18 VI 1940".

== Sources ==
- Kazimierz Sobczak [red.]: Encyklopedia II wojny światowej. Warszawa: Wydawnictwo Ministerstwa Obrony Narodowej, 1975
