= Lagarde, Moselle =

Lagarde
- Commune
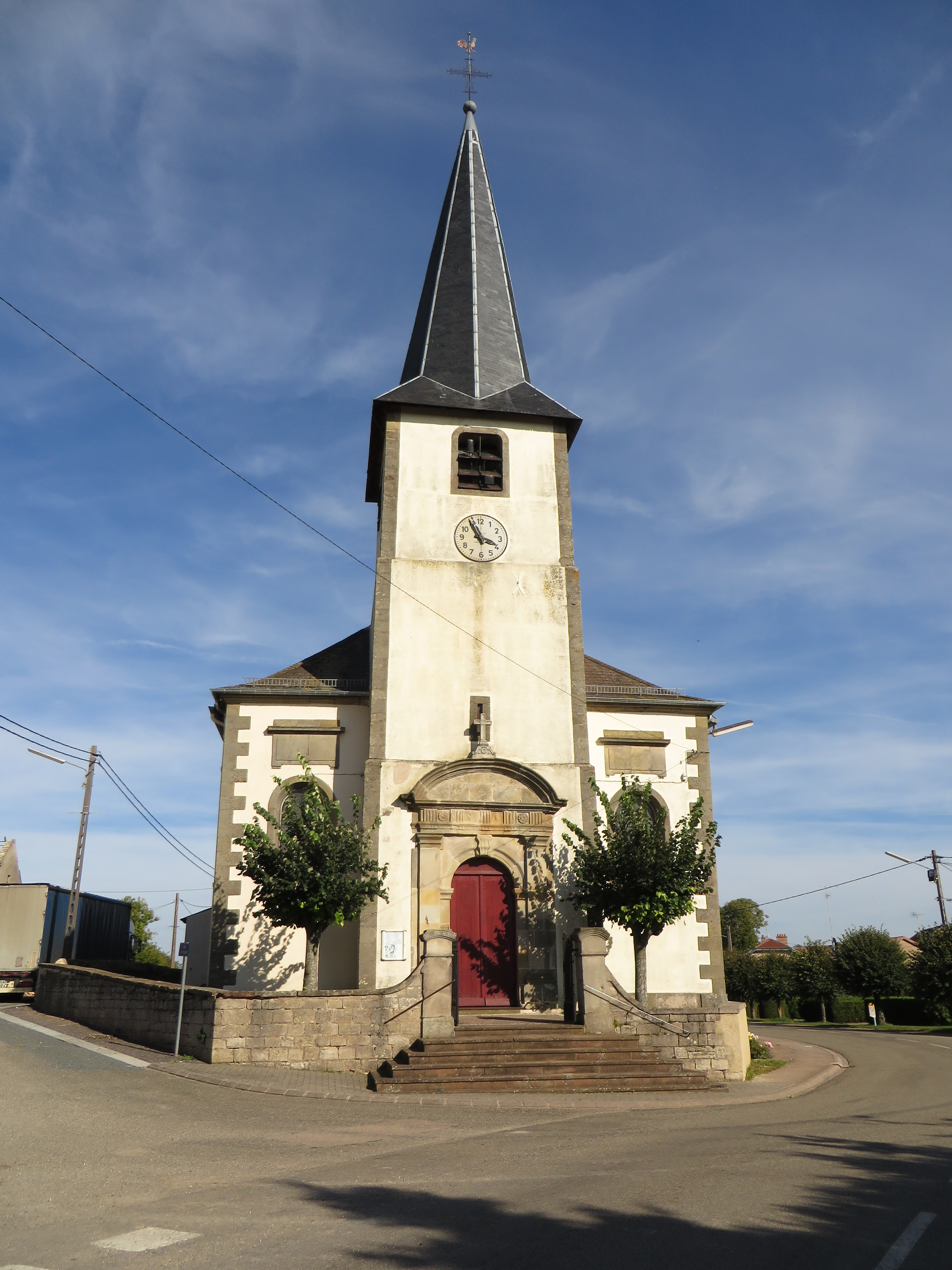
- The church in Lagarde

- Coat of arms
- Location of Lagarde
- Location within France Location within Grand Est
- Coordinates: 48°41′32″N 6°42′21″E
- Country: France
- Region: Grand Est
- Department: Moselle
- Arrondissement: Sarrebourg-Château-Salins
- Canton: Le Saulnois
- Intercommunality: CC du Saulnois

Government
  - Mayor (2020–2026): Livier Hamant
- Area^{1}: 22.26 km^{2} (8.59 sq mi)
- Elevation: 242 m (794 ft)
- Highest elevation: 283 m (928 ft)
- Lowest elevation: 220 m (720 ft)
- Population (2023): 179
  - Density: 8.04/km^{2} (20.8/sq mi)
- Time zone: UTC+01:00 (CET)
  - Summer (DST): UTC+02:00 (CEST)
- INSEE/Postal code: 57375 /57810
- ^{1} French Land Register data, which excludes lakes, ponds, glaciers > 1 km^{2} (0.386 sq mi or 247 acres) and river estuaries.

Lagarde (French pronunciation: [laɡaʁd]; German: Gerden) is a commune in the Moselle department in Grand Est in north-eastern France.

== See also ==
- Communes of the Moselle department
- Parc naturel régional de Lorraine
