= York Rangers =

Canadian military unit (1866–1936)

The York Rangers
- Active: 1866-1936
- Country: Canada
- Branch: Canadian Militia
- Type: Rangers
- Role: Infantry
- Size: One battalion 1866–1922; Two battalions 1922–1925; One battalion 1925–1936
- Part of: Non-Permanent Active Militia
- Garrison/HQ: Aurora, Ontario
- Motto(s): Latin: celer et audax, lit. 'swift and bold'
- Engagements: Fenian Raids; North-West Rebellion; South African War; First World War
- Battle honours: See #Battle honours

The York Rangers was an infantry regiment of the Non-Permanent Active Militia [NPAM] of the Canadian Militia (now the Canadian Army). Although the unit was first officially created in 1866, the regiment traces its ancestry and origins as far back to Rogers' Rangers of the Seven Years' War, the Queen's Rangers of the American Revolutionary War and also the York Militia of the War of 1812. In 1936, the regiment was amalgamated with The Queen's Rangers (1st American Regiment) to form The Queen's York Rangers (1st American Regiment).

== History ==
On 10 April 1885, the 12th York Rangers mobilized four companies for active service during the North-West Rebellion with the York and Simcoe Provisional Battalion. The battalion served in the Alberta Column of the North West Field Force. On 24 July 1885, these companies were removed from active service.

=== Great War ===
When the Canadian Expeditionary Force was raised in September 1914, the 12th York Rangers contributed drafts to help raise the 4th Battalion (Central Ontario), CEF. The regiment also contributed drafts to help form the 20th Battalion (Central Ontario), CEF.

On 7 November 1914, the 35th Battalion, CEF was authorized for service. On 9 February 1915, the battalion was redesignated as the 35th Reserve Battalion, CEF and on 16 October 1915, the battalion embarked for Great Britain. After its arrival in the UK, the battalion provided reinforcements to the Canadian Corps in the field. On 4 January 1917, the battalion’s personnel were absorbed by the 4th Reserve Battalion, CEF. On 8 December 1917, the 35th Battalion, CEF was disbanded.

On 22 December 1915, the 127th Battalion (12th York Rangers), CEF was authorized for service and on 21 August 1916, the battalion embarked for Great Britain. After its arrival in the UK, the battalion provided reinforcements to the Canadian Corps in the field. On 20 November 1916, the battalion was reorganized as a railway battalion. On 13 January 1917, the battalion disembarked in France and on 3 February 1917, the battalion was redesignated the 2nd Battalion, Canadian Railway Troops, CEF. From 1917 until early 1918, the battalion provided special light railway engineering services to the British Expeditionary Force in France and Flanders. During the German Spring Offensive of 1918, the battalion would resume its original infantry role continued in the Allied Frontline until the Amiens Offensive of August 1918. Soon after, the battalion resumed its railway battalion role until the end of the war. On 23 October 1920, the 127th Battalion (12th York Rangers), CEF was disbanded.

On 15 July 1916, the 220th Battalion (12th Regiment York Rangers), CEF was authorized for service and on 26 January 1917, the battalion embarked for Great Britain. On 7 May 1917, the battalion’s personnel were absorbed by the 3rd Reserve Battalion, CEF to provide reinforcements for the Canadian Corps in the field. On 1 September 1917, the 220th Battalion, CEF was disbanded.

== Lineage ==
=== The York Rangers ===
- Originated on 14 September 1866, in Aurora, Ontario, as the 12th York Battalion of Infantry.
- Redesignated on 10 May 1872, as the 12th Battalion of Infantry or York Rangers.
- Redesignated on 8 May 1900, as the 12th Regiment York Rangers.
- Redesignated on 1 May 1920, as The York Rangers.
- Amalgamated on 15 December 1936, with The Queen's Rangers (1st American Regiment) and redesignated as The Queen's York Rangers (1st American Regiment) (MG).

=== Lineage chart ===
Lineage chart

1862	Scarborough Rifle Coy	Aurora Infy Coy	Lloydtown Infy Rifle Coy
1863	King Infy Coy
1866	Newmarket Infy Coy
1866	12th "York Bn of Infy"
1872	12th Bn of Infy or "York Rangers"
1900	12th Regt "York Rangers"
1914	35th Bn, CEF
1915	127th "Overseas" Bn, CEF	35th Reserve Bn, CEF
1916	220th "Overseas" Bn, CEF
1917	2nd Bn, CRT, CEF	Absorbed by 3rd Reserve Bn, CEF	Absorbed by 4th Reserve Bn, CEF
1920	Disbanded
1920	1st Bn, The York Rangers	3rd Bn (127th Bn, CEF), (Note: Reserve order of battle) The York Rangers	4th Bn (220th Bn, CEF), The York Rangers	2nd Bn (35th Bn, CEF), The York Rangers
1922	2nd Bn (35th Bn, CEF), (Note: Non Permanent Active Militia order of battle) The York Rangers
1st Bn (20th Bn, CEF), The West Toronto Regt
1925	1st Bn (127th Bn, CEF), The York Rangers	Disbanded	2nd Bn (220th Bn, CEF), The York Rangers	1st Bn (20th Bn, CEF), The Queen's Rangers
1927	2nd Bn (35th Bn, CEF), The York Rangers	1st Bn (20th Bn, CEF), The Queen's Rangers, 1st American Regt
1929	3rd (Reserve) Bn (220th Bn, CEF), The York Rangers
1936	Disbanded	Disbanded
1936	The Queen's York Rangers (1st American Regt) (MG)

== Perpetuations ==
- 35th Battalion, CEF
- 127th Battalion (12th York Rangers), CEF
- 220th Battalion (12th Regiment York Rangers), CEF

== Structure ==
=== 12th York Battalion of Infantry (14 September 1866) ===
- No. 1 Company (Scarborough, Ontario) (first raised in September 1862 as the Scarborough Rifle Company)
- No. 2 Company (Aurora, Ontario) (first raised in December 1862 as the Aurora Infantry Company)
- No. 3 Company (Lloydtown, Ontario) (first raised in December 1862 as the Lloydtown Infantry Company; absorbed in 1872 by the Aurora company)
- No. 4 Company (King, Ontario) (first raised in January 1863 as the King Rifle Company)
- No. 5 Company (Newmarket, Ontario)

=== 12th York Battalion of Infantry (October 1866) ===
- Regimental Headquarters (Newmarket, Ontario)
- No. 1 Company (Scarborough, Ontario)
- No. 2 Company (Aurora, Ontario)
- No. 3 Company (Lloydtown, Ontario) (absorbed in 1872 by the Aurora company)
- No. 4 Company (King, Ontario)
- No. 5 Company (Newmarket, Ontario)
- No. 6 Company (Keswick, Ontario; moved in 1867 to Sutton, Ontario)
- No. 7 Company (Markham, Ontario)
- No. 8 Company (Sharon, Ontario)
- No. 9 Company (Unionville, Ontario) (raised in November 1866)

=== The York Rangers (1 December 1920) ===
- Regimental Headquarters (Aurora, Ontario)
- 1st Battalion (Aurora, Ontario) (perpetuating the 127th Battalion, CEF)
- 2nd Battalion (perpetuating the 35th Battalion, CEF)
- 3rd (Reserve) Battalion (perpetuating the 127th Battalion, CEF)
- 4th (Reserve) Battalion (perpetuating the 220th Battalion, CEF)

=== The York Rangers (1 August 1925) ===
- Regimental Headquarters (Aurora, Ontario)
- 1st Battalion (Aurora, Ontario) (perpetuating the 127th Battalion, CEF)
- 2nd (Reserve) Battalion (perpetuating the 35th Battalion, CEF (jointly with The Queen's Rangers))
- 3rd (Reserve) Battalion (perpetuating the 220th Battalion CEF)

== Alliances ==
- United Kingdom - The Green Howards (Alexandra, Princess of Wales's Own Yorkshire Regiment) (Until 1936)

== Battle honours ==
=== North West Rebellion ===
- North West Canada, 1885

=== Great War ===
- Ypres, 1915, '17 (Note: Selected to be borne on colours and appointments)
- Festubert, 1915
- Mount Sorrel
- Somme, 1916, '18
- Arras, 1917, '18
- Hill 70
- Pilckem
- Langemarck, 1917
- Menin Road
- Polygon Wood
- Broodseinde
- Poelcappelle
- Passchendaele
- St. Quentin
- Amiens
- Hindenburg Line
- Pursuit to Mons
- France and Flanders, 1915–18
