= Queen's Rangers (1st American Regiment) =

The Queen’s Rangers (1st American Regiment)
- Active: 1921–1936
- Country: Canada
- Branch: Canadian Militia
- Type: Light infantry
- Role: Artillery observer Close combat Cold-weather warfare Raiding; Reconnaissance; Tracking; Trench warfare
- Part of: Non-Permanent Active Militia
- Garrison/HQ: Toronto, Ontario
- Motto: Pristinae virtutis memor (Latin for 'Remembering their glories in former days')
- Engagements: First World War
- Battle honours: See #Battle honours

The Queen's Rangers (1st American Regiment) was a light infantry regiment of the Non-Permanent Active Militia of the Canadian Militia (now the Canadian Army). First organized in 1921 as The West Toronto Regiment, the regiment was reorganized in 1925 as The Queen's Rangers and again in 1927 as The Queen's Rangers (1st American Regiment), assuming the title, insignia and heritage of the Queen's Rangers from the American Revolutionary War and early days of Upper Canada. In 1936, the regiment was amalgamated with The York Rangers to form The Queen's York Rangers (1st American Regiment).

== Lineage ==
=== The Queen's Rangers (1st American Regiment) ===
- Originated on 15 January 1921, in Toronto, Ontario, as The West Toronto Regiment.
- Amalgamated on 1 August 1925, with the 2nd Battalion (35th Battalion, CEF), The York Rangers and redesignated as The Queen's Rangers.
- Redesignated on 1 December 1927, as The Queen's Rangers (1st American Regiment).
- Amalgamated on 15 December 1936, with The York Rangers and redesignated as The Queen's York Rangers (1st American Regiment) (MG).

== History ==
=== Great War ===
On 7 November 1914, the 20th Battalion (Central Ontario), CEF, was authorized for service and on 15 May 1915, the battalion embarked for Great Britain. On 15 September 1915, the battalion disembarked in France where it fought as part of the 4th Canadian Infantry Brigade, 2nd Canadian Division in France and Flanders until the end of the war. On 30 August 1920, the 20th Battalion was disbanded.

On 7 November 1914, the 35th Battalion, CEF, was authorized for service. On 9 February 1915, the battalion was redesignated as the 35th Reserve Battalion, CEF, and on 16 October 1915, the battalion embarked for Great Britain. After its arrival in the UK, the battalion provided reinforcements to the Canadian Corps in the field. On 4 January 1917, the battalion’s personnel were absorbed by the 4th Reserve Battalion, CEF. On 8 December 1917, the 35th Battalion was disbanded.

=== The West Toronto Regiment ===
Following the end of the First World War, the Otter Commission was established to determine how the units of the wartime raised Canadian Expeditionary Force would be perpetuated in the peacetime Canadian Militia. As a result of the commission, a new regiment was formed in the Toronto area, known as The West Toronto Regiment. The new regiment was granted the perpetuation of the 20th Battalion (Central Ontario), CEF, which had served on the Western Front with the 2nd Canadian Division.

=== The Queen's Rangers (1st American Regiment) ===
In 1925, new budget cuts and regulations from the Department of National Defence established that no infantry regiment of the militia was to have more than one active battalion. This directly affected another Toronto-based regiment, The York Rangers, which had two active battalions. As such, on 1 August 1925, the 2nd Battalion The York Rangers was amalgamated with The West Toronto Regiment and the newly formed unit was redesignated as The Queen’s Rangers, reviving the heritage of the Queen's Rangers commanded by John Graves Simcoe during the early days of Upper Canada. This amalgamation also brought with it the additional perpetuation of the wartime 35th Battalion carried over to the new unit.

On 1 December 1927, King George V formally redesigned the regiment as The Queen's Rangers (1st American Regiment), and further authorized the regiment to readopt the same badge used by Simcoe’s Rangers back in 1779.

On 15 December 1936, as a result of the 1936 Canadian Militia reorganization, The Queen's Rangers (1st American Regiment) was amalgamated with The York Rangers to form The Queen's York Rangers (1st American Regiment) (MG).

== Organization ==
=== The West Toronto Regiment (15 January 1921) ===
- Regimental Headquarters (Toronto)
- 1st Battalion (Toronto) (perpetuating the 20th Battalion, CEF)
- 2nd (Reserve) Battalion

=== The Queen's Rangers (01 August, 1925) ===
- Regimental Headquarters (Toronto)
- 1st Battalion (Toronto) (redesignation of 1st Battalion, The West Toronto Regiment; perpetuating the 20th Battalion, CEF)
- 2nd (Reserve) Battalion (redesignation of 2nd Battalion, The York Rangers; perpetuating the 35th Battalion, CEF)

== Perpetuations ==
- 20th Battalion (Central Ontario), CEF
- 35th Battalion, CEF

== Alliances ==
- The Queen's Royal Regiment (West Surrey) (until 1936)
- 2nd Battalion (The City of Newcastle Regiment) (1934–1936)

== Battle honours ==
- Mount Sorrel
- Somme, 1916, '18
- Flers-Courcelette
- Thiepval
- Ancre Heights
- Arras, 1917, '18
- Vimy, 1917
- Hill 70
- Ypres, 1917
- Passchendaele
- Amiens
- Scarpe, 1918
- Drocourt-Quéant
- Hindenburg Line
- Canal du Nord
- Cambrai, 1918
- Pursuit to Mons
- France and Flanders, 1915–18
