= 19th Battalion (Central Ontario), CEF =

The 19th Battalion (Central Ontario), CEF
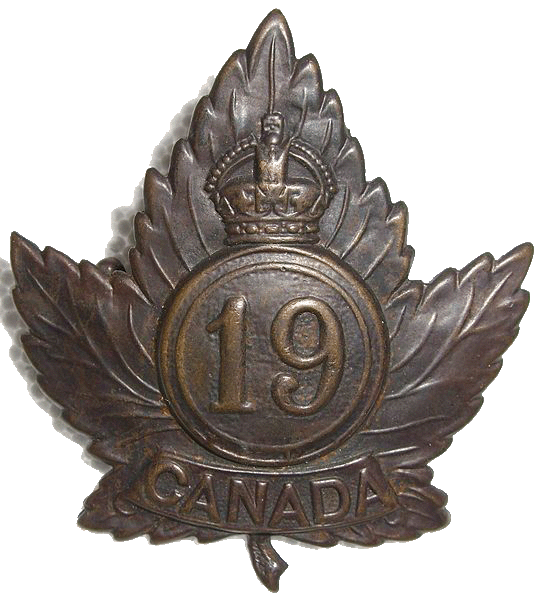
- The cap badge of the 19th Battalion
- Active: 6 November 1914 – 30 April 1919
- Country: Canada
- Branch: 2nd Canadian Division, CEF Canadian Corps
- Type: Line Infantry
- Role: Light Infantry
- Size: One battalion
- Part of: British Army
- Engagements: Battle of Flers-Courcelette, Battle of Thiepval, Battle of Le Transloy, Battle of the Ancre Heights, 1916. Vimy Ridge, Hill 70, Passchendaele, 1917. First Battle of the Somme (1918), Battle of Amiens, Second Battle of the Somme (1918), Drocourt-Quéant, Battle of the Hindenburg Line, Canal du Nord, Pursuit to Mons, 1918.

Commanders
- Notable commanders: Lieutenant Colonel J. I. McLaren (first commander)

Insignia
- Formation patch (August 1916–1919)

The 19th Battalion (Central Ontario), CEF was an infantry battalion of the First World War Canadian Expeditionary Force.

== History ==
The battalion was originally raised at Exhibition Park in Toronto, Ontario, Canada on 6 November 1914.

As part of the 4th Canadian Brigade, 2nd Canadian Division, the 19th went from its station in Toronto to West Sandling Camp, Shorncliffe, England, 23 May 1915 and then to France on 14 September 1915 where it served from 1915 to 1919.

=== 1916 World War Service ===
==== Battle of Thiepval ====
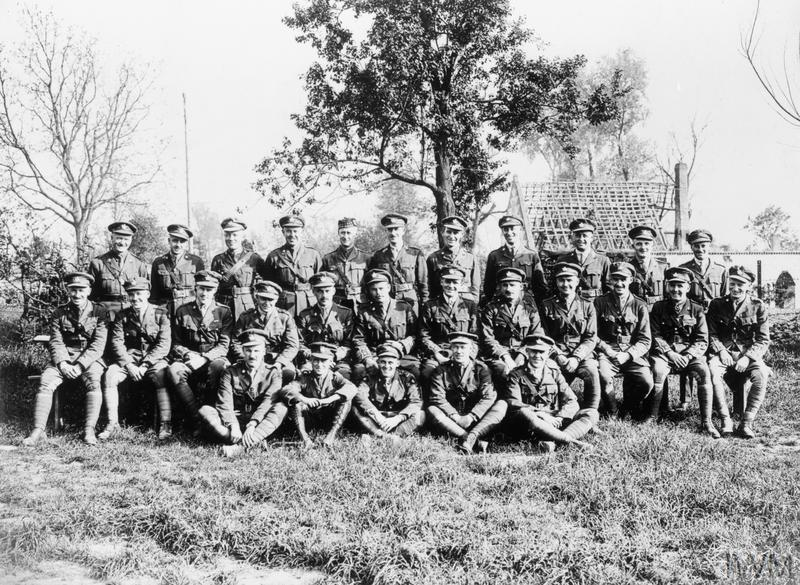
Group photograph of officers of the Canadian 19th Infantry Battalion, May 1918.

The 19th moved out at 6:45 p.m. on 25 September 1916, following the 20th, 18th, and 21st Canadian battalions on the Albert-Bapaume road toward Courcelette. They were instructed to be at the ready for any movement as they staged themselves at the road with G.F. Morrison commanding. On the 26th, the 19th was instructed to move to Sausage Valley and be ready, and they arrived on the 27th. On the 28th, the 19th was instructed to push forward towards Le Sars where the enemy line was. On the 29th, heavy artillery fire rained down on their position, resulting in heavy casualties. Reports came in that the British had taken the Destremont farm southwest of Le Sars while snipers fired on their position. With a fair amount of shelling coming from Pys, orders came from Rennie to push forward. In his diary of the action at Thiepval, Private John Mould of the 19th expressed the intensity of the advance:

Unmerciful shells were sent over in dozens and within a very short time the ground all around us looked to all appearance like a newly ploughed field. How we escaped without being cut up is one of the things I am not able to explain. I had a very close call myself during this bombardment, a shell bursting within 2 yards of where I was digging. I never knew a thing for a few minutes, the force of the explosion sending me quite silly. It was an awful experience and one which I hoped would not happen again. After about 5 hours of this terrible anxiety, things became much quieter so we were able to proceed with our work of digging more quicker than before. Keeping hard at it during the night, we had by the morning completed 3 lines of trenches and also consolidated them good enough to protect the Battalion from machine gun fire and shrapnel.

On 15 October 1916, Major General Richard Turner, commander of the 2nd Canadian Division, decorated the men who were honoured for their recent service in battle.

==== Battle of Le Transloy ====
The 19th, without its D-Company, who had joined the 20th Battalion, joined with the 18th and 20th Canadian Infantry Battalions, the 4th and 5th Canadian Infantry Brigades, and the 23rd British Division on 1 October 1916 in a concentrated attack of the German lines near Le Transloy. On 3 October, D-Company rejoined the 19th, and were relieved by the 21st Canadian Infantry Battalion. Total losses were 13 killed, 87 wounded, 29 sick, and 3 missing.

=== 1917 World War Service ===
- Vimy Ridge
- Hill 70
- Passchendaele

=== 1918 World War Service ===
- First Battle of the Somme (1918)
- Battle of Amiens
- Second Battle of the Somme (1918)
- Drocourt-Quéant
- Battle of the Hindenburg Line
- Battle of the Canal du Nord
- Pursuit to Mons

== Perpetuation ==
The 19th Battalion (Central Ontario), CEF is perpetuated by The Argyll and Sutherland Highlanders of Canada (Princess Louise's).

== See also ==
- List of infantry battalions in the Canadian Expeditionary Force
