= Queen's York Rangers (1st American Regiment) =

Coordinates: 43.6369°N 79.4080°W

The Queen's York Rangers (1st American Regiment) (RCAC)
- Regimental badge
- Active: 14 September 1866 in its current form (1775 as the Queen's Rangers) – present
- Country: Great Britain (1775–1801); United Kingdom (1801–1867); Canada (1867–present)
- Branch: Canadian Army
- Type: Armoured cavalry
- Part of: 32 Canadian Brigade Group
- Garrison/HQ: Fort York Armoury, Toronto
- Mottos: Pristinae virtutis memor (Latin for 'remembering their glories in former days'); Celer et audax (Latin for 'swift and bold')
- Colours: Green and amethyst blue
- March: "Braganza"
- Engagements: American Revolution; War of 1812; Upper Canada Rebellion; North-West Rebellion; First World War; Second World War; War in Afghanistan
- Battle honours: See list

Commanders
- Colonel of the Regiment: Edith Dumont (ex officio as Lieutenant Governor)
- Honorary Colonel: HCol Sally M. Horsfall Eaton
- Honorary Lieutenant-Colonel: HLCol Clint Davis
- Commanding Officer: LCol Adam West
- Regimental Sergeant Major: CWO Mason Baines

The Queen's York Rangers (1st American Regiment) (RCAC) is a Canadian Army Primary Reserve regiment of the Royal Canadian Armoured Corps. Based in Toronto and Aurora, Ontario, the regiment is part of 2nd Canadian Division's 32 Canadian Brigade Group. The regiment consists of one cavalry squadron (D Squadron), as well as the Headquarters and Training Squadron. The regimental family also includes The Queen's York Rangers Band (volunteer), along with two Royal Canadian Army Cadet corps and a Royal Canadian Air Cadet squadron. The unit mottos are pristinae virtutis memor – 'remembering their glories in former days' – and celer et audax – 'swift and bold'. Among its own members and those of other regiments, the unit is referred to as the Rangers. The name is abbreviated as QY Rang, and sometimes pronounced /ˈkwaɪræŋ/ KWY-rang.

== Lineage ==
=== Pre-Confederation ===
The regiment traces its direct origins to Robert Rogers and his Rangers in 1756 during the French and Indian Wars. Disbanded after seven years of hard service, Rogers re-formed the Rangers in 1775, and they soon were carried on the British Army list as The Queen's Rangers, First American Regiment. The Rangers were particularly distinguished under John Graves Simcoe in 1777 at the Battle of Brandywine and were shipped to New Brunswick at the end of the war in 1783. When Simcoe was appointed as the first lieutenant governor of Upper Canada, he made a stop in New Brunswick, raised the Queen's Rangers again, and brought them with him in 1793 to Upper Canada. The Rangers were stood down again in 1802 and became the York Militia. They became active again during the War of 1812 and again during the Upper Canada Rebellion in 1837–1838.

=== The York Rangers ===
The York County Militia was reconstituted again on 14 September 1866 as the 12th "York Battalion of Infantry".

It was redesignated as the 12th Battalion of Infantry or "York Rangers" on 10 May 1872, as the 12th Regiment "York Rangers" on 8 May 1900 and, following the Great War, as The York Rangers on 1 May 1920.

On 15 December 1936, it was amalgamated with The Queen's Rangers (1st American Regiment) and redesignated The Queen's York Rangers (1st American Regiment) (MG).

It was redesignated as the 2nd (Reserve) Battalion, The Queen's York Rangers (1st American Regiment) on 5 March 1942

- as The Queen's York Rangers (1st American Regiment) (Reserve) on 15 September 1944
- as The Queen's York Rangers (1st American Regiment) on 30 November 1945
- as the 25th Armoured Regiment (Queen's York Rangers), RCAC on 19 June 1947
- The Queen's York Rangers (1st American Regiment) (25th Armoured Regiment) on 4 February 1949
- The Queen's York Rangers (1st American Regiment) (RCAC) on 19 May 1958
- The Queen's York Rangers (RCAC) on 3 September 1985
- and The Queen's York Rangers (1st American Regiment) (RCAC) on 12 November 2004.

=== The Queen's Rangers (1st American Regiment) ===
The Queen's Rangers (1st American Regiment) was formed in Toronto, Ontario on 15 January 1921 as The West Toronto Regiment. On 1 August 1925, it was amalgamated with the 2nd Battalion (35th Battalion, CEF), The York Rangers and redesignated The Queen's Rangers. It was redesignated The Queen's Rangers (1st American Regiment) on 1 December 1927. On 15 December 1936, it was amalgamated with The York Rangers.

=== Lineage chart ===
Lineage of the Queen's York Rangers (1st American Regiment) (RCAC)

1812	Bn of Incorporated Militia of Upper Canada	1st Regt of York Militia	3rd Regt of York Militia
1815	Disbanded	Disbanded	Disbanded
1862	Scarborough Rifle Coy	Aurora Infy Coy	Lloydtown Infy Rifle Coy
1863	King Infy Coy
1866	Newmarket Infy Coy
1866	12th "York Bn of Infy"
1872	12th Bn of Infy or "York Rangers"
1885	Active service (4 coys) April–July
1900	12th Regt "York Rangers"
1914	35th Bn, CEF	20th Bn, CEF
1915	127th "Overseas" Bn, CEF	35th Reserve Bn, CEF
1916	220th "Overseas" Bn, CEF
1917	2nd Bn, CRT, CEF	Absorbed by 3rd Reserve Bn	Absorbed by 4th Reserve Bn
1920	Disbanded	Disbanded
1920	3rd Bn (127th Bn, CEF), (Note: Reserve) The York Rangers	4th Bn (220th Bn, CEF), The York Rangers	1st Bn, The York Rangers	2nd Bn (35th Bn, CEF), The York Rangers
1921	1st Bn (20th Bn, CEF), The West Toronto Regt	2nd Bn, The West Toronto Regt
1922	2nd Bn (35th Bn, CEF), (Note: Non Permanent Active Militia) The York Rangers
1925	Disbanded	2nd Bn (220th Bn, CEF), The York Rangers	1st Bn (127th Bn, CEF), The York Rangers	1st Bn (20th Bn, CEF), The Queen's Rangers	2nd Bn (35th Bn, CEF), The Queen's Rangers
1927	2nd Bn (35th Bn, CEF), The York Rangers	1st Bn (20th Bn, CEF), The Queen's Rangers, 1st American Regt	2nd Bn (35th Bn, CEF), The Queen's Rangers, 1st American Regt
1929	3rd (Reserve) Bn (220th Bn, CEF), The York Rangers
1936	Disbanded	Disbanded	The Queen's York Rangers (1st American Regt) (MG)	Disbanded
1942	1st Bn, The Queen's York Rangers (1st American Regt), CASF	2nd (Reserve) Bn, The Queen's York Rangers (1st American Regt)
1943	Disbanded
1944	The Queen's York Rangers (1st American Regt) (Reserve)
1945	The Queen's York Rangers (1st American Regt)
1947	25th Armd Regt (Queen's York Rangers), RCAC
1949	The Queen's York Rangers (1st American Regt) (25th Armd Regt)
1958	The Queen's York Rangers (1st American Regt) (RCAC)
1985	The Queen's York Rangers (RCAC)
2004	The Queen's York Rangers (1st American Regt) (RCAC)
2012	Perpetuates War of 1812 units

== Perpetuations ==
War of 1812:

- Battalion of Incorporated Militia of Upper Canada
- 1st Regiment of York Militia.
- 3rd Regiment of York Militia.

Great War:

- 20th Battalion (Central Ontario), CEF
- 35th Battalion, CEF
- 127th Battalion (12th York Rangers), CEF
- 220th Battalion (12th Regiment York Rangers), CEF

== History ==
=== North-West Rebellion ===
The 12th Battalion of Infantry (York Rangers) mobilized four companies for active service on 10 April 1885. The companies served with the York and Simcoe Provisional Battalion in the Alberta Column of the North West Field Force. The companies were removed from active service on 24 July 1885.

=== First World War ===
The distinguishing patch of the 20th Battalion (Central Ontario), CEF.

The 20th Battalion (Central Ontario), CEF was authorized on 7 November 1914 and embarked for Britain on 15 May 1915. It disembarked in France on 15 September 1915, where it fought as part of the 4th Canadian Infantry Brigade, 2nd Canadian Division in France and Flanders until the end of the war. For much of the war, the commanding officer of the battalion was Lieutenant-Colonel C.H. Rogers, a descendant of Robert Rogers. The battalion performed particularly well at the Battle of the Somme, Vimy Ridge, Hill 70, Passchendaele, and at Amiens and Canal du Nord in 1918. Two of its members, Lieutenant Wallace Lloyd Algie and Sergeant Frederick Hobson, were posthumously awarded the Victoria Cross.

The 20th Battalion was disbanded on 30 August 1920. Altogether, 4,310 officers and men had served in the battalion; 843 were killed in action or died of wounds (often having been wounded earlier) and 1,855 were wounded—often several times. Some 22 members of the battalion had been taken prisoner during the war with the largest haul being when nine were taken when evacuating casualties at Passchendaele.

The 35th Battalion, CEF was authorized on 7 November 1914 and embarked for Britain on 16 October 1915. The battalion was redesignated the 35th Reserve Battalion, CEF on 9 February 1915, and it provided reinforcements to the Canadian Corps in the field until 4 January 1917 when its personnel were absorbed by the 4th Reserve Battalion, CEF. The battalion was disbanded on 8 December 1917.

The 127th Battalion (12th York Rangers), CEF was authorized on 22 December 1915 and embarked for Britain on 21 August 1916. It provided reinforcements to the Canadian Corps in the field until 20 November 1916 when it was reorganized as a railway battalion. It disembarked in France on 13 January 1917, and was redesignated the 2nd Battalion, Canadian Railway Troops, CEF on 3 February 1917, where it provided special engineering services to the British Expeditionary Force in France and Flanders until the end of the war.

In April 1918 as the second great German offensive of the year rolled back over the old Somme Battlefield, the 127th was pressed into service as infantry near Amiens. Although initially trained as infantry, the battalion had not been employed as such but the men were apparently eager to show they could fight even if they were only armed with rifles. Combing through the chaos of Amiens, a large number of 'surplus' Lewis guns were 'acquired' and the battalion entered the line with considerably more firepower than might have been expected. At any rate, the German advance was being slowed up by exhausted troops and the usual logistical problems created in moving over World War I battlefields. The attempt to dislodge the 127th was not a determined one and the battalion's inordinate firepower debarred further attempts. The position they secured remained the Allied front line until the Amiens Offensive of 8 August 1918. Once relieved, the 127th returned to its previous duties. The battalion was disbanded on 23 October 1920.

The 220th Battalion (12th Regiment York Rangers), CEF was authorized on 15 July 1916 and embarked for Britain on 26 January 1917, where its personnel were absorbed by the 3rd Reserve Battalion, CEF on 7 May 1917 to provide reinforcements for the Canadian Corps in the field. The battalion was disbanded on 1 September 1917.

=== Second World War ===
Details from the regiment were called out on service on 26 August 1939 and placed on active service on 1 September 1939 for local protection duties until disbanded on 31 December 1940. The regiment subsequently mobilized the 1st Battalion, The Queen's York Rangers (1st American Regiment), CASF on 5 March 1942.40 It served in Canada in a home defence role as part of Military District No. 2, until disbanded on 15 October 1943. Altogether, over 2,000 Rangers served in the Second World but those who went overseas did so in other regiments.

In 2011, the Minister of National Defence approved the ex officio honorary appointment of the Lieutenant Governor of Ontario as the unit's Colonel of the Regiment in perpetuity. The appointment recognizes the regiment's links to John Graves Simcoe, the first Lieutenant Governor of Upper Canada and the regiment's commander during the American War of Independence.

The regiment's vehicles now include, according to official sources, the G Wagon - Light Utility Vehicle Wheeled (LUVW); Textron Tactical Armoured Patrol Vehicle (TAPV); and the Medium Support Vehicle System (MSVS).

== Battle honours ==
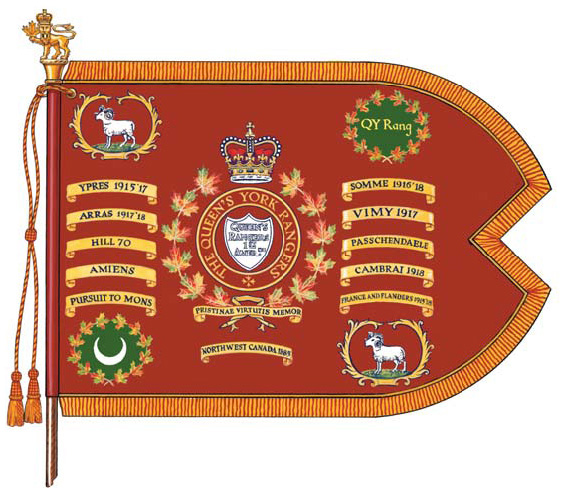
The 1984–2022 guidon (prior to emblazoning of additional honours)

The following list are the battle honours awarded to the battalions and regiments perpetuated by the Rangers as well as to the Rangers themselves. They are organized by the campaign. Battle honours in small capitals are for large operations and campaigns and those in lowercase are for more specific battles. Bold type indicates honours emblazoned on the regimental guidon. Guidons were presented in 1984 and in 2022. The 2022 guidon is the first to include honours from the War of 1812 and Afghanistan.

War of 1812
- **Defence of Canada – 1812–1815** – Défense du Canada
- **Detroit**
- **Queenston**
- **Niagara**
North West Rebellion
North West Canada, 1885
First World War
- **Ypres, 1915, '17**
- Festubert, 1915
- Mount Sorrel
- **Somme, 1916, '18**
- Flers–Courcelette
- Thiepval
- Ancre Heights
- **Arras, 1917, '18**
- **Vimy, 1917**
- **Hill 70**
- Pilchkem
- Langemarck, 1917
- Menin Road
- Polygon Wood
- Broodseinde
- Poelcappelle
- **Passchendaele**
- St. Quentin
- **Amiens**
- Scarpe, 1918
- Drocourt–Quéant
- Hindenburg Line
- Canal du Nord
- **Cambrai, 1918**
- **Pursuit to Mons**
- **France and Flanders, 1915–18**
South-West Asia
Afghanistan

== Alliances ==
- United Kingdom - The Princess of Wales's Royal Regiment (Queen's and Royal Hampshires)
- United Kingdom - The Royal Yorkshire Regiment (14th/15th, 19th and 33rd/76th Foot)

== Band ==
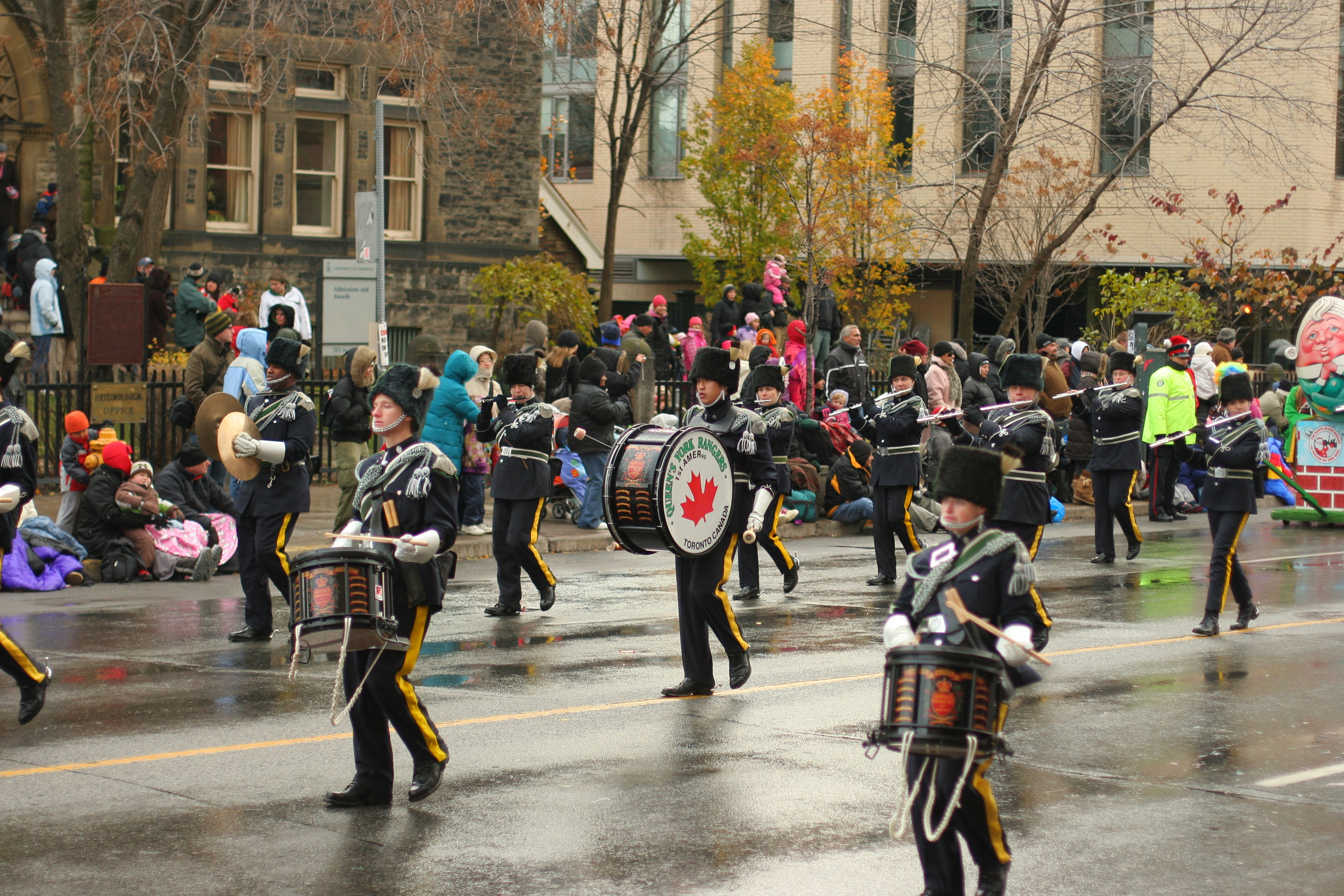
Members of the regimental band during the 2008 Toronto Santa Claus Parade.

Since the 1970s, the regiment has maintained a volunteer fife and drums band. Over the years, the number of bandsmen were lowered until the unit was reduced to nil strength. The Streetsville Pipes and Drums were formed in 1986 and in 2009, made an arrangement with the regiment that they would adopt a second persona as the Regimental Band of The Queen's York Rangers.

== Regimental museum ==
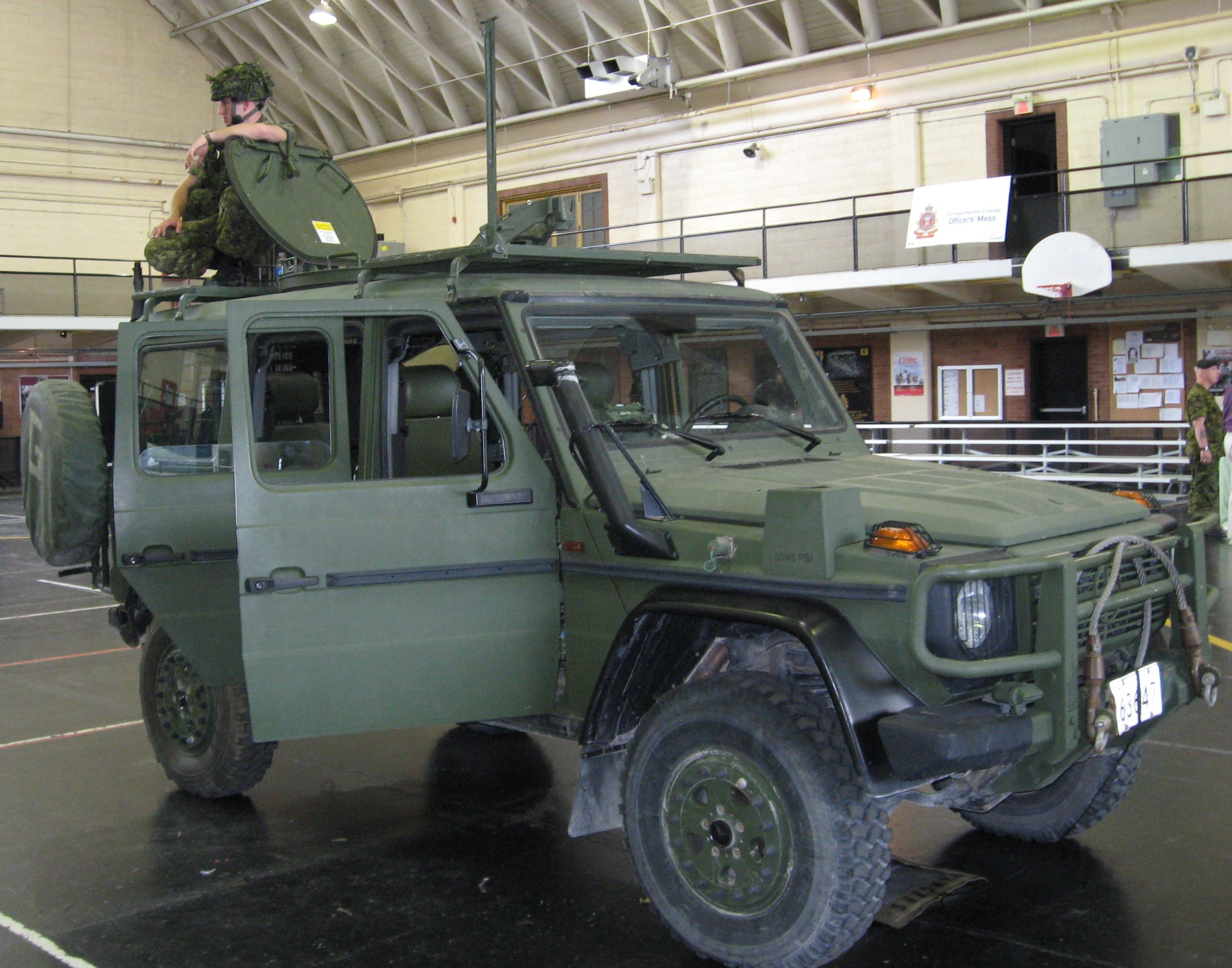
G-Wagen reconnaissance vehicle of the Queen's York Rangers (1st American Regiment) (RCAC)

The museum preserves and displays the history of The Queen's York Rangers (1st American Regiment) and its several predecessors for the benefit of both the members of the Regiment and the public at large. The museum is affiliated with the Canadian Museums Association, the Canadian Heritage Information Network, the Organization of Military Museums of Canada and Virtual Museum of Canada.

== Armouries ==
Site	Date(s)	Designated	Location	Description	Image
Aurora Armoury; 89 Mosley Street	1874	1991 Recognized - Register of the Government of Canada Heritage Buildings	Aurora, Ontario	The oldest purpose-built armoury used by the military in Ontario until 2014; this gable-roofed, wood frame building is home to The Queen's York Rangers (1st American Regiment) (RCAC). Sold to Town of Aurora and replaced by John Graves Simcoe Armouries.	
Fort York Armoury; 660 Fleet Street,	1933-35	1991 Federal Heritage building; on the Register of the Government of Canada Heritage Buildings	Toronto, Ontario	Designed by architects Marani, Lawson and Morris in an industrial area of Toronto; this large, two-storey, drill hall with a concrete, vaulted roof is home to Queen's York Rangers (1st American Regiment)	
