= 20th Battalion (Central Ontario), CEF =

- The distinguishing patch of the 20th Battalion (Central Ontario), CEF.
- Active: 1914-1919
- Country: Canada
- Branch: Canadian Expeditionary Force
- Role: Infantry
- Size: battalion
- Engagements: First World War

The 20th Battalion (Central Ontario), CEF was a unit of the First World War Canadian Expeditionary Force.

== Service history ==
The battalion was composed of volunteers from militia units in central Ontario. Much of the unit was drawn from the 12th Regiment, the York Rangers, with men coming from ten other militia regiments – of which four still exist. The unit fought in France and Flanders as part of the 4th Canadian Brigade, 2nd Canadian Division. Notable actions include the Somme, Vimy Ridge, Hill 70, Passchendaele, Amiens, the advance along the Scarpe, Canal du Nord, Canal de l'Escaut and the advance to Mons in the Last Hundred Days. The battalion was disbanded in 1920.

== Casualties ==
4,310 officers and men served in the 20th Battalion during the war altogether. Of them, 843 (19.6%) were killed in action or died of wounds—often having been wounded earlier. Another 1,855 (43%) were wounded, often repeatedly. 91 died of disease or accidentally. Ottawa stopped counting the deaths to old injuries, mental trauma and exposure to gas as war deaths in 1922 while the nominal roll of the 20th (privately held after the battalion disbanded) attributed these to the war until 1928. Only 22 were ever taken prisoner—nine of them in one incident when a stretcher party went astray at Passchendaele. There was also one deserter who crossed to the German lines in 1916; his name and fate are not recorded.

== Awards and honours ==
A total of 398 decorations and awards were made to soldiers of the 20th Battalion, including two awards of the Victoria Cross:

- Sgt Frederick Hobson was posthumously awarded the VC for actions on 18 August 1917, near Lens, France at the Battle of Hill 70.
- Lt Wallace Lloyd Algie was posthumously awarded the VC for actions on 11 October 1918, near Iwuy, France.

In addition, ten officers earned the Distinguished Service Order (one did so twice), while 45 officers received the Military Cross, and four a second award of the MC. Among the enlisted men, 24 received the Distinguished Conduct Medal and 231 awards of the Military Medal, including 14 receiving it twice.

== Perpetuations ==
The perpetuation of the 20th Battalion was initially assigned in 1920 to 1st Battalion (20th Battalion, CEF), The Peel Regiment. A year later in 1921, the perpetuation was reassigned to 1st Battalion (20th Battalion, CEF), The West Toronto Regiment. The perpetuation has been handed down through the following units:

- 1920–1921: 1st Battalion (20th Battalion, CEF), The Peel Regiment
- 1921–1925: 1st Battalion (20th Battalion, CEF), The West Toronto Regiment
- 1925–1927: 1st Battalion (20th Battalion, CEF), The Queen's Rangers
- 1927–1936: 1st Battalion (20th Battalion, CEF), The Queen's Rangers, 1st American Regiment
- 1936–1942: The Queen's York Rangers (1st American Regiment) (Machine Gun)
- 1942–1947: The Queen's York Rangers (1st American Regiment)
- 1947–1949: 25th Armoured Regiment (Queen's York Rangers), RCAC
- 1949–1958: The Queen's York Rangers (1st American Regiment) (25th Armoured Regiment)
- 1958–1985: The Queen's York Rangers (1st American Regiment) (RCAC)
- 1985–2004: The Queen's York Rangers (RCAC)
- 2004–present: The Queen's York Rangers (1st American Regiment) (RCAC)

== Battle honours ==
- Mount Sorrel
- Somme, 1916, 18
- Flers-Courcelette
- Thiepval
- Ancre Heights
- Arras 1917, '18
- Vimy 1917
- Arleux
- Scarpe, 1917, '18
- Hill 70
- Ypres, 1917
- Passchendaele
- Amiens
- Hindenburg Line
- Canal du Nord
- Cambrai, 1918
- Pursuit to Mons
- France and Flanders 1915-18

== See also ==
- List of infantry battalions in the Canadian Expeditionary Force
