= William Leeming Harrison =

- Born: December 30, 1899; Toronto, Ontario, Canada
- Died: January 6, 1960 (aged 60); Auckland, New Zealand
- Burial place: Auckland, New Zealand
- Military career
- Allegiance: King George V of the British Empire
- Branch: Canadian Expeditionary Force; Royal Flying Corps
- Service years: 1916 - 1919
- Rank: Captain
- Units: 220th Battalion (12th Regiment York Rangers), CEF, No. 40 Squadron RAF, No. 1 Squadron RAF
- Conflicts: WW1
- Awards: Military Cross with Bar

Captain William Leeming Harrison MC was a Canadian fighter ace in the First World War. He was credited with twelve aerial victories.

== Enlistment information ==
William Leeming Harrison enlisted in the 220th Battalion (12th Regiment York Rangers), CEF of the Canadian Expeditionary Force on 3 April 1916 in his home town of Toronto. He gave his birth date as 30 December 1897, although he may have provided a false age. He was a student living at home with his father, Doctor William Spencer Harrison. The military doctor noted the younger Harrison's age as 18 years 3 months, his appearance as fair, with brown eyes and dark hair. He was 5 feet 11 inches tall, and had a scar on his right thumb.

== First World War ==
Circumstances of Harrison's early service are still cloudy. There are two records of his becoming an officer. On 29 May 1917, Harrison was commissioned as a lieutenant in the Canterbury Mounted Rifles. Effective 17 June 1917, Harrison was commissioned as a probationary second lieutenant.

He finished pilot's training in summer 1917 and was assigned to fly a Nieuport in C Flight, 40 Squadron. On 9 August 1917, he destroyed a German observation balloon over Arras for his first victory. The squadron re-equipped with new Royal Aircraft Factory SE.5as, and Harrison used his new craft for his second victory, when he destroyed a Deutsche Flugzeug-Werke reconnaissance plane on 18 January 1918. On 26 February, he drove down an Albatros D.V out of control. Mid-day and late afternoon wins on 6 March made him an ace. He scored five more times in March, ending the month as a double ace. After destroying another German plane on 1 April, he was promoted to captain and transferred to 1 Squadron as a flight commander. He destroyed a Pfalz D.III on 11 April 1918, to round out his tally at a balloon and seven enemy airplanes destroyed, and four driven down out of control. He was then wounded and left combat duty. His Military Cross was awarded in May 1918, with a Bar in lieu of a second award following.

== Text of citation for Military Cross ==
2nd Lt. William Leeming Harrison, R.F.C., Spec. Res.

For conspicuous gallantry and devotion to duty in aerial fighting. He destroyed two enemy machines and drove down others out of control. He always showed a splendid spirit of dash, keenness and tenacity, coupled with determination and skill in attacking enemy aircraft.

Harrison was also awarded a Bar to his Military Cross in lieu of a second award.

== Post War ==
Harrison went on the unemployed list of the Royal Air Force on 29 September 1919.
