= 4th Canadian Infantry Brigade =

Brigade of the Canadian Army

- 2nd Canadian Infantry Division Formation Patch
- Active: 1915–1919; 1939–1945
- Country: Canada
- Branch: Canadian Expeditionary Force; Canadian Army
- Type: Infantry
- Size: Brigade
- Part of: 2nd Canadian Division
- Engagements: World War I; Western Front; World War II; Allied occupation of Iceland; Dieppe Raid; Normandy; The Scheldt; The Rhineland; Battle of Groningen

Commanders
- Notable commanders: Robert Rennie; Sherwood Lett

The 4th Canadian Infantry Brigade was an infantry brigade of the Canadian Army active during World War I and World War II. Raised in 1915, the brigade formed part of the 2nd Canadian Division and fought on the Western Front between 1916 and 1918. The brigade was re-raised in 1939 for service during World War II and subsequently took part in actions at Dieppe in 1942 and then in north-west Europe during 1944 and 1945.

== History ==
=== World War I ===
The formation of the 2nd Canadian Division began in May 1915 in Britain following the arrival of a large contingent of soldiers from Canada. The 2nd Division remained in Great Britain only a short time before embarking for France in September 1915. Under the command of Major-General R.E.W. Turner, its members spent a long and bitterly cold winter in a Belgian section of the front between Ploegsteert Wood and Saint-Eloi, south of Ypres. The brigade's first major combat took place during the actions of St Eloi Craters in March–April 1916. Infantry units as well as artillery units of the 2nd Canadian Division served in both France and Flanders until Armistice Day. It was disbanded by May 1919.

The 4th Brigade took part in the following battles:

1916:

- Battle of Flers-Courcelette
- Battle of Thiepval
- Battle of Le Transloy
- Battle of the Ancre Heights

1917:

- Vimy Ridge
- Hill 70
- Passchendaele

1918:

- First Battle of the Somme (1918)
- Battle of Amiens
- Second Battle of the Somme (1918)
- Drocourt–Quéant
- Battle of the Hindenburg Line
- Canal du Nord
- Pursuit to Mons

=== World War II ===
It was mobilized on 1 September 1939 part of 2nd Canadian Infantry Division, even before the declaration of war, and the battalions were promptly fleshed out by volunteers. However, further expansion of the Brigade was hindered by a temporary halt in recruitment and uncertainty about overseas deployment. Consequently, the brigade headquarters were not actually formed until May and June 1940. The 2nd Division conducted Operation Jubilee, a large-scale raid on Dieppe, France in August 1942 with the 4th and 6th Canadian Infantry Brigades, suffering extensive losses in the landing and the ensuing withdrawal.

Following reconstruction, the 4th Brigade, along with the rest of the 2nd Canadian Division, moved to Normandy in time to serve with the British 2nd Army. It then participated in the advance along the Channel coast with the Canadian 1st Army including the liberation of Dieppe. The division saw heavy action in the Netherlands in late 1944 and took part in the final offensives in 1945.

== Organization ==
=== World War I ===
The 4th Canadian Brigade consisted of the following units during World War I:

- 18th (Western Ontario) Battalion Canadian Infantry
- 19th (Central Ontario) Battalion Canadian Infantry
- 20th (Central Ontario) Battalion Canadian Infantry
- 21st (Eastern Ontario) Battalion Canadian Infantry
- 4th Canadian Machine Gun Company
- 4th Canadian Trench Mortar Battery

=== World War II ===
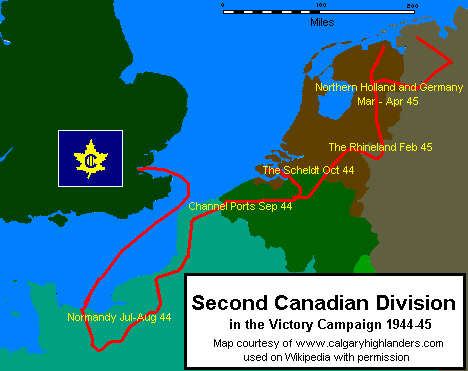
Second Canadian Division in the Victory Campaign 1944–1945.

In 1939, the 2nd Division was organized along regional lines, like the 1st Canadian Infantry Division. The initial order of battle for the 4th Infantry Brigade was as follows:

- The Royal Regiment of Canada – Toronto, Ontario
- The Royal Hamilton Light Infantry (Wentworth Regiment) – Hamilton, Ontario
- The Essex Scottish Regiment – Windsor, Ontario
- The Cameron Highlanders of Ottawa (Machine Gun) – Ottawa, Ontario

By 1944–45 the brigade consisted of:

- 1st Battalion, The Royal Regiment of Canada
- 1st Battalion, The Royal Hamilton Light Infantry
- 1st Battalion, The Essex Scottish Regiment
- 4th Infantry Brigade Ground Defence Platoon (Lorne Scots)

== Awards ==
Four members of the brigade received the Victoria Cross:

- Frederick Hobson of the 20th Battalion for actions on the Western Front in 1917.
- Wallace Lloyd Algie of the 20th Battalion for actions on the Western Front in 1918.
- Rev. John Weir Foote, VC, CD (5 May 1904 – 2 May 1988 ), Regimental Chaplain to The Royal Hamilton Light Infantry (Wentworth Regiment) for work with the wounded at the Dieppe Raid.
- Frederick Albert Tilston acting major in The Essex Scottish Regiment. During the Battle of the Rhineland, he volunteered to lead an infantry company in an attack on the Hochwald. After leading "C" Company in a 500-yard attack and wounded, he refused to be evacuated while he organized a defence against German counter-attacks.

== Brigade Commanders during the Second World War ==
- Brigadier C.B. Topp: 20 May 1940 – 28 February 1942
- Brigadier S. Lett: 1 March – 19 August 1942 (WIA) (First Tenure)
- (Position Vacant / under Acting Command): 20 August – 7 September 1942
- Brigadier M.H.S. Penhale: 8 September 1942 – 7 April 1943
- Brigadier J.E. Sager: 8 April 1943 – 26 February 1944
- Brigadier S. Lett: 27 February – 18 July 1944 (WIA) (Second Tenure)
- Lieutenant Colonel F.A. Clift: 18 July – 2 August 1944 (Acting Commander)
- Brigadier J.E. Ganong: 3 August – 30 August 1944
- Brigadier F.N. Cabeldu: 31 August 1944 – 27 June 1945
- (Position Vacant / under Acting Command): 28 June – September 1945 (Disbanded)

== See also ==
- Military history of Canada during the Second World War
- Military history of Canada
- Canadian Forces
