= 21st Battalion (Eastern Ontario), CEF =

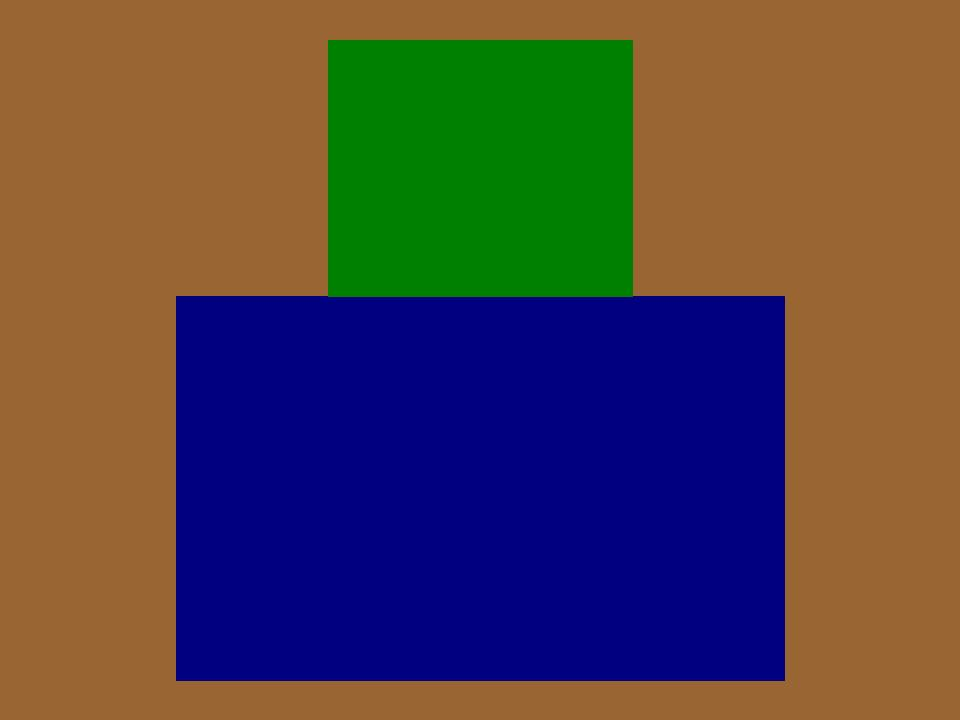
- The distinguishing patch of the 21st Battalion (Eastern Ontario), CEF.
- Active: 1914-1920
- Country: Canada
- Branch: Canadian Expeditionary Force
- Role: Infantry
- Size: battalion
- Engagements: First World War

The 21st Battalion (Eastern Ontario), CEF was an infantry battalion of the Canadian Expeditionary Force in the Great War.

== History ==
The battalion was authorized on 7 November 1914 and embarked for Britain on 6 May 1915. It disembarked in France on 15 September 1915, where it fought as part of the 4th Canadian Brigade, 2nd Canadian Division in France and Flanders. The battalion was disbanded on 30 August 1920.

The 21st Battalion recruited in Eastern Ontario and was mobilized at Kingston, Ontario.

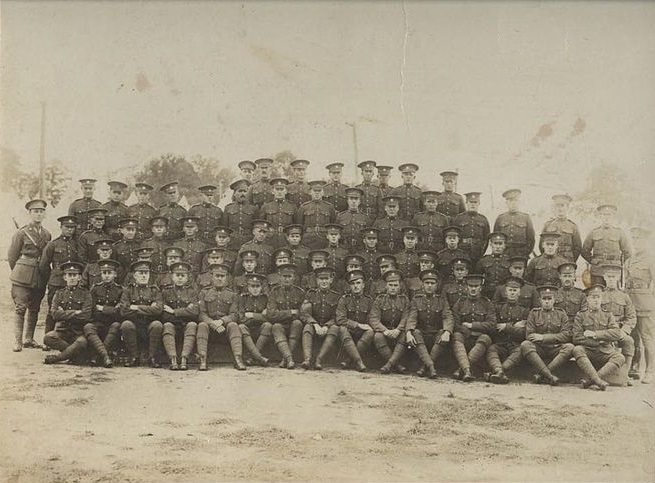
21st Regiment Carling's Heights -London, Ontario Sep 30 1917

== Officers Commanding ==
The 21st Battalion had five Officers Commanding:

- Lt.-Col. William St Pierre Hughes, 6 May 1915 – 18 July 1916
- Lt.-Col. E.W. Jones, DSO, 18 July 1916 – 7 January 1917
- Lt.-Col. Thomas F. Elmitt, 7 January 1917 – 1 July 1917
- Lt.-Col. Elmer Watson Jones, DSO, 1 July 1917 – 8 August 1918
- Lt.-Col. H.E. Pense, DSO, 8 August 1918-Demobilization

The Ottawa Branch of the 21st Battalion Association erected a memorial plaque at St. Andrew's Presbyterian Church (Ottawa) which is dedicated to Brigadier General William St Pierre Hughes, DSO, VD, first Commanding Officer of the battalion.

== Perpetuation ==
The 21st Battalion (Eastern Ontario), CEF, is perpetuated by The Princess of Wales' Own Regiment.

== Battle honours ==
The 21st Battalion was awarded the following battle honours:

- Mont Sorrel
- Somme, 1916 & 1918
- Flers-Courcelette
- Thiepval
- Ancre Heights
- Arras, 1917 & 1918
- Vimy Ridge, 1917
- Hill 70
- Passchendaele
- Amiens
- Scarpe, 1918
- Drocourt-Quéant
- Hindenburg Line
- Canal du Nord
- Cambrai, 1918
- Pursuit to Mons
- France & Flanders, 1915-18

== Media ==
Capt. Herbert W. McBride, who served with the 21st Battalion, wrote two books about his experiences as a member of the unit during the Great War as a sniper and machine gunner: "A Rifleman Went To War" and "The Emma Gees."

== Notable members ==
- Frank McGee

== See also ==
- List of infantry battalions in the Canadian Expeditionary Force

== Sources ==
- Canadian Expeditionary Force 1914-1919 by Col. G.W.L. Nicholson, CD, Queen's Printer, Ottawa, Ontario, 1962
- A Rifleman Went To War, by Capt. Herbert W. McBride, MM, Small Arms Technical Publishing Company 1935, ISBN 978-1-62358-028-5
- The Emma Gees, by Capt. Herbert W. McBride, MM, The Bobbs-Merrill Company Publishers, 1918, ISBN
