= Okill Massey Learmonth =

Okill Massey Learmonth VC MC
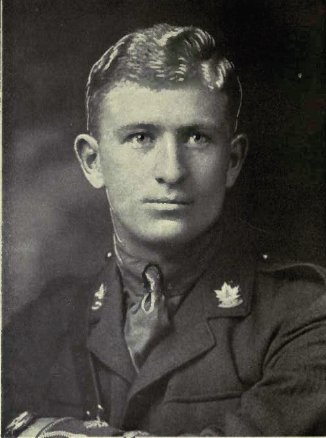
- Born: 20 February 1894; Quebec City, Canada
- Died: 19 August 1917 (aged 23); Lens, France
- Burial place: Noeux-les-Mines Communal Cemetery
- Military career
- Allegiance: Canada
- Branch: Canadian Expeditionary Force
- Service years: 1914 - 1917
- Rank: Major
- Units: 2nd (Eastern Ontario) Battalion
- Conflicts: First World War: Battle of Hill 70 †
- Awards: Victoria Cross; Military Cross

Okill Massey Learmonth, VC, MC (20 February 1894 – 19 August 1917), was a Canadian soldier. Learmonth was a recipient of the Victoria Cross, the highest and most prestigious award for gallantry in the face of the enemy that can be awarded to Commonwealth forces. Learmonth served in the Canadian Expeditionary Force during World War I, and was awarded his medal posthumously for actions at the Battle of Hill 70.

== Details ==
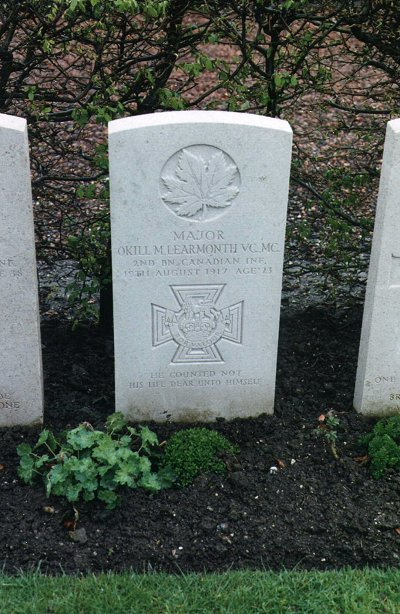
Learmonth's grave

Learmonth was 23 years old, and an acting Major in the 2nd (Eastern Ontario) Battalion, Canadian Expeditionary Force, during the First World War when the following deed took place for which he was awarded the VC.

On 18 August 1917 east of Loos, France, during a determined counter-attack on our new positions, Major Learmonth, when his company was momentarily surprised, instantly charged and personally disposed of the attackers. Later, although under intense barrage fire and mortally wounded, he stood on the parapet of the trench, bombing the enemy and on several occasions he actually caught bombs thrown at him and threw them back. When unable to carry on the fight, he still refused to be evacuated and continued giving instructions and invaluable advice, finally handing over all his duties before he was moved to hospital where he died.

Major OKill Massey Learmouth, M.C., late of the Canadian Infantry:" For most conspicuous bravery and exceptional devotion to duty. During a determined counter-attack on our new positions, this officer, when his company was momentarily surprised, instantly charged, and personally disposed of the attackers. Later he carried on a tremendous fight with the advancing enemy. Although under an intense barrage fire and mortally wounded, he stood on the parapet of the trench and bombed the enemy continuously and directed the defence in such a manner as to infuse a spirit of the utmost resistance into his men. On several occasions this very brave officer actually caught bombs thrown at him by the enemy and threw them back."

  Major Learmouth was only 23 years old. He enlisted in Quebec as a ranker, was promoted to corporal on the field and received a commission in June, 1916. He married Nursing Sister S.W. Tamarche, who was attached to the Canadian medical head-quarters and has since been invalided home. Major Learmouth received the Military Cross for bravery during personal reconnaissance . He died of wounds last August, three days after the announcement of the Military Cross award. He had three months' leave in Canada in 1916. He was employed in Government service. ref.: The Montreal Gazette issue Vol.CXLVL No.269, date: November 9, 1917. Front page.

== Further information ==
Born in Quebec City, Canada, he was elected a member of the Literary and Historical Society of Quebec in March 1914. He is buried at Noeux-les-Mines Communal Cemetery, France, 2 miles northwest of Lens (plot 11, row K, grave 9). Learmonth Street in Quebec City, Canada is named after him. Major Learmonth's VC is held by the Canadian War Museum in Ottawa, on loan from the Governor General's Foot Guards who perpetuate the 2nd Battalion, CEF.
