= 127th Battalion (12th York Rangers), CEF =

The 127th (12th York Rangers) Battalion, CEF was a unit in the Canadian Expeditionary Force during the First World War. Based in Toronto, Ontario, the unit began recruiting in late 1915 in York County. After sailing to England in August 1916, the battalion was redesignated the 2nd Battalion, Canadian Railway Troops on November 8, 1916. The 127th (12th York Rangers) Battalion, CEF had one Officer Commanding: Lieut-Col. F. F. Clarke, DSO.

As railway troops, the battalion specialized in building light railway lines close to the front (a Canadian specialty) for the rapid movement of troops and supplies from established railway heads. The battalion prided itself on its rapid bridge-building skills and an improvised turntable it crafted on several occasions.

In April 1918 as the second great German offensive of the year rolled back over the old Somme battlefield, the 127th was pressed into service as infantry near Amiens. Although initially trained as infantry, the battalion had not been employed as such but the men were apparently eager to show they could fight even if they were only armed with rifles. Combing through the chaos of Amiens, a large number of 'surplus' Lewis guns were 'acquired' and the battalion entered the line with considerably more firepower than might have been expected. At any rate, the German advance was being slowed up by exhausted troops and the usual logistical problems created in moving over First World War battlefields. The attempt to dislodge the 127th was not a determined one and the battalion's inordinate firepower debarred further attempts.

The position they secured remained the Allied frontline until the Amiens Offensive of August 8, 1918. Once relieved, the 127th returned to its previous duties.

The battalion is perpetuated by The Queen's York Rangers (1st American Regiment) (RCAC).
