= Frederick Hobson =

Sergeant Frederick Hobson VC
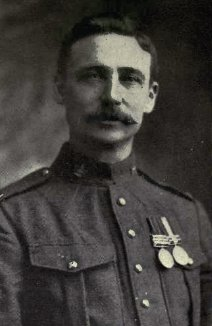
- Frederick Hobson in uniform.
- Born: 23 September 1873; London, England
- Died: 18 August 1917 (aged 43); Hill 70, France
- Military career
- Allegiance: United Kingdom; Canada
- Branch: British Army; Canadian Militia: Canadian Expeditionary Force
- Service years: 1914–1917 (Canada)
- Rank: Sergeant
- Units: Wiltshire Regiment; 2nd Canadian Division: 4th Canadian Infantry Brigade; 20th (Central Ontario) Battalion
- Conflicts: Second Boer War; First World War: Western Front; Battle of Hill 70 †
- Awards: Victoria Cross

Frederick Hobson VC (23 September 1873 – 18 August 1917) was a soldier in the Canadian Expeditionary Force, and recipient of the Victoria Cross, the highest military award for gallantry in the face of the enemy given to British and Commonwealth forces, during the First World War.

== Details ==
Hobson was from England, having emigrated in 1904. He had served previously in the British Army during the Second Boer War with the Wiltshire Regiment, and enlisted in the Canadian Expeditionary Force in November 1914. He was 43 years old, and a sergeant in the 20th Battalion (Central Ontario), CEF during World War I. On 18 August 1917, during the Battle of Hill 70 north-west of Lens, France, he performed a deed for which he was awarded the Victoria Cross.

=== Citation ===
No. 57113 Sjt. Frederick Hobson, late Can. Inf. Bn.

During a strong enemy counter-attack a Lewis gun in a forward post in a communication trench leading to the enemy lines, was buried by a shell, and the crew, with the exception of one man, killed.

Sjt. Hobson, though not a gunner, grasping the great importance of the post, rushed from his trench, dug out the gun, and got it into action against the enemy who were now advancing down the trench and across the open.

A jam caused the gun to stop firing. Though wounded, he left the gunner to correct the stoppage, rushed forward at the advancing enemy and, with bayonet and clubbed rifle, single handed, held them back until he himself was killed by a rifle shot. By this time however, the Lewis gun was again in action and reinforcements shortly afterwards arriving, the enemy were beaten off.

The valour and devotion to duty displayed by this non-commissioned Officer gave the gunner the time required to again get the gun into action, and saved a most serious situation.

— London Gazette

== Medal ==
His Victoria Cross is displayed at the Canadian War Museum in Ottawa, Ontario, Canada. A replica of his medal and copy of his citation are also on display at the Sgt. F. Hobson VC Armoury in Simcoe, Canada.
