= 220th Battalion (12th Regiment York Rangers), CEF =

The 220th (12th York Rangers) Battalion, CEF was a unit in the Canadian Expeditionary Force during the First World War. Based in Toronto, Ontario, the unit began recruiting in early 1916 in York County, Ontario. After sailing to England in April 1917, the battalion was absorbed into the 3rd Reserve Battalion on May 18, 1917. The 220th (12th York Rangers) Battalion, CEF had one officer commanding: Lieutenant-Colonel B. H. Brown.

A newspaper report entitled "Active Campaign to Fill York Battalion / Energetic Measures to Secure Young Men Who Are Still Eligible" appeared in the Toronto World on 5 April 1916 discussed the recruiting efforts to date:

"Practically every business and professional man in Newmarket yesterday pledged his hearty support to the work of raising recruits for the 220th York Overseas Battalion, and today an active campaign will be undertaken to raise the Newmarket end of it in record time. Following the campaign put up by Lieut.-Col. Clarke, it was at one time feared that difficulty would be experienced in getting the men, but latest reports are reassuring. Scarboro has been one of the most active of the municipalities in the county in raising recruits, but at least 40 young unmarried men are still eligible for active service and can be spared without working any hardship on the farmers themselves. These figures, it is said, can be easily duplicated in every other municipality in the county. Lieut.-Col. Brown is adopting the most energetic measures to secure men, and officers have been despatched to all centres."

On April 14, the Toronto World reported again upon the progress of the 220th's recruiting drive:

"At the weekly meeting of the 220th York Rangers' Overseas Battalion at headquarters last night, the reports submitted from all parts of the county and especially in the neighborhood of Newmarket were very encouraging. At Aurora, nine recruits signed up and seven at Newmarket. The end of the week will see 50 men enlisted at Newmarket in the 220th York Rangers."

Recruiting had slowed according to another report appearing in the Toronto World on April 21:

"At a meeting of the headquarters staff of the 220th York Rangers' Overseas Battalion held last night in St. Paul's Hall reports indicated that recruiting in the country districts is proceeding slowly. About 200 have enlisted in the 220th to date, and unseasonable weather is blamed for the poor showing. Newsmarket, Runnymede and Stouffville are the best recruiting points."

A recruiting rally was held on May 30, 1916, as reported by the Toronto Star the following day:

"The 220th York Rangers held a recruiting rally in Ramsden Park last night, Capt. C. F. Mills and Lieut. Pickup delivered addresses. The former was very fair, and complimented the married men on what they had done, but claimed that the unmarried men spent their time in the pool rooms and evaded recruiting officers. The bugle band supplied music."

In 1920 the perpetuation of the 220th Battalion was assigned to the York Rangers. Because of amalgamations, the perpetuation is now carried on by the York Rangers' successor, the Queen's York Rangers (1st American Regiment) (RCAC).
