= Somme 1918 (Battle honour) =

Somme 1918 was a battle honour awarded to units of the British and Imperial Armies that took part in one or more of the following engagements in the Great War:

- First Battle of the Somme (1918), 21 March – 5 April 1918
- Second Battle of the Somme (1918), 21 August – 5 September 1918

These should not be confused with the Battle of the Somme of 1916.
