= Battle of Hill 70 =

Battle of World War I

- Part of The Western Front of the First World War
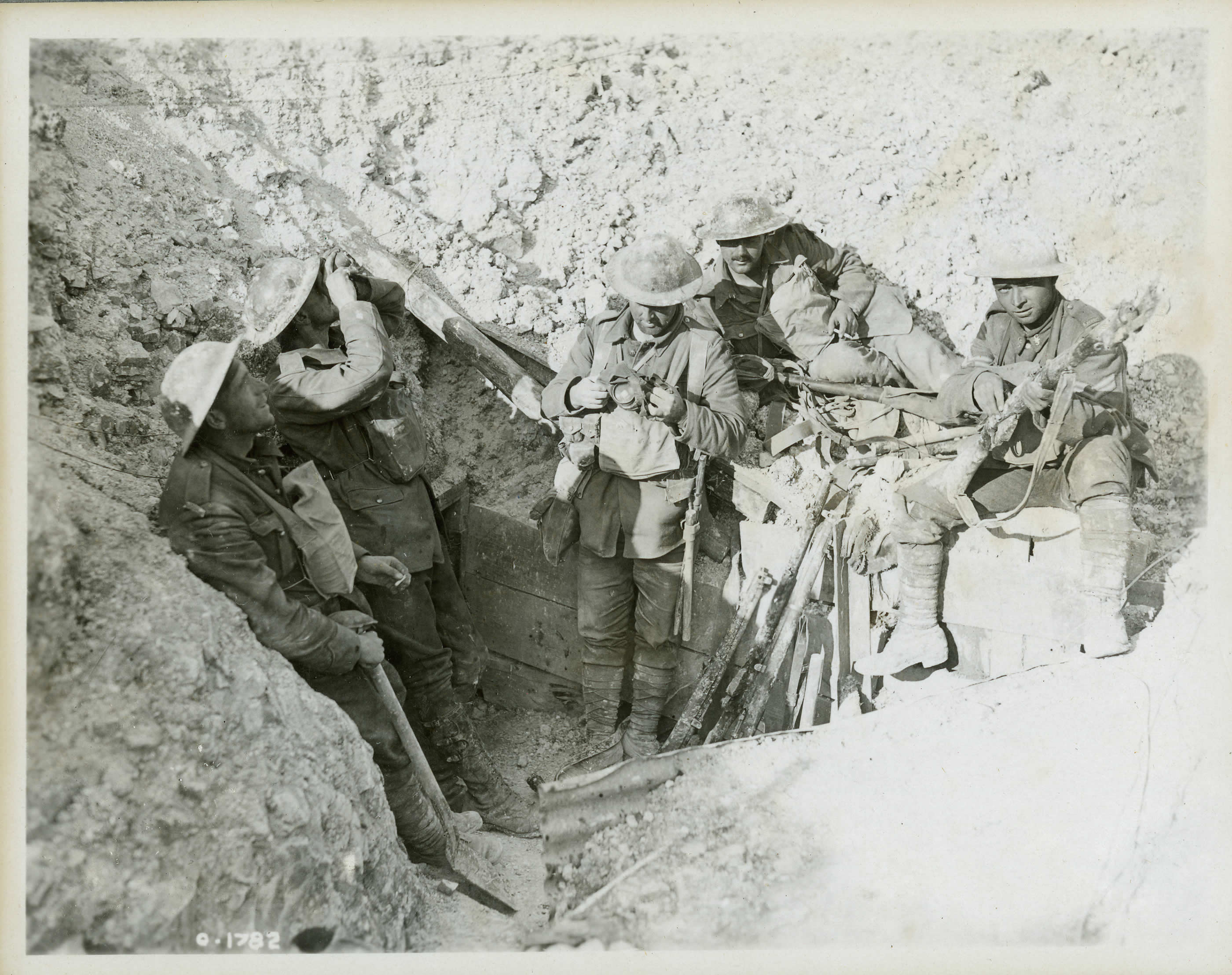
- Canadian soldiers in a captured German trench
Date	15 to 25 August 1917
Location	Lens, France 50°27′20″N 2°49′8.50″E
Result	Allied victory

Belligerents
Canada	German Empire

Commanders and leaders
(Canada) Sir Arthur Currie	(German Empire) Otto von Below

Strength
4 divisions	5 divisions

Casualties and losses
8,677	c. 10,000 including 1,369 taken prisoner

The Battle of Hill 70 took place in the First World War between the Canadian Corps and attached units against five divisions of the German 6th Army. The battle took place along the Western Front on the outskirts of Lens in the Nord-Pas-de-Calais region of France between 15 and 25 August 1917.

The plan was to inflict casualties, to draw German troops away from the 3rd Battle of Ypres and to make the German hold on Lens untenable. The Canadian Corps captured Hill 70 to establish defensive positions from which combined small-arms and artillery fire, some of which used the new technique of predicted fire, would inflict mass casualties on German counter-attacks. The Germans were prevented from transferring divisions to the Ypres Salient but did not bring in troops from other areas.

The Canadian Corps failed to enter Lens but German and Canadian assessments concluded that it succeeded in its attrition objective. The battle was costly for both sides and many casualties were suffered from extensive use of poison gas, including the new German Yellow Cross shell (mustard gas).

== Background ==
=== Western front ===
By May 1917, the Nivelle Offensive, despite the successful opening of the Battle of Arras, had come to a disastrous conclusion with the French Army mutinies. On 30 April, as the French hesitated to continue the Second Battle of the Aisne (16 April – 9 May 1917), the commander of the British Expeditionary Force, Field Marshal Sir Douglas Haig, gave orders to the First Army (General Henry Horne), to advance towards Lens to gain a line from Méricourt to Sallaumines Hill, Lens and Hill 70. Horne already desired to cut off the salient containing Lens to shorten the front, while unwilling to risk a costly and slow frontal assault into the maze of ruins. The First Army was understrength after the Battle of Arras but since Operation Alberich, the German withdrawal to the Hindenburg Line, in March, there was some hope that the 6th Army (General Otto von Below) could be manoeuvred out of Lens by gradual advances to capture the higher ground to the south, west and north of the city.

On 7 May, Haig informed the British army commanders that the French had terminated the Nivelle Offensive and the strategy of returning to a war of manoeuvre. Operations to exhaust the powers of resistance of the German armies would resume by systematic, surprise attacks and when this was complete, the British would begin an offensive at Ypres to capture the Belgian coast and reach the frontier with the Netherlands. The objectives of the First Army were unchanged but instead of capturing ground around Lens to shorten the front, was to menace the German hold on Lens and the defences south of Lille, to divert and to weaken the 6th Army. The operations were not a diversion but a means to keep the First Army front active for as long as possible, to mislead the Germans as to British intentions in Flanders. On 8 May, Horne told the First Army corps commanders that

The ruling principles in the conduct of these operations will be careful selection of important objectives of a limited nature, deliberate preparation of the attack, concentration of artillery and economy of infantry, combined in each case with feint attacks and smoke and gas on other positions of the front.

— First Army GS 651, 8 May 1917

On 7 July, Haig gave orders that the Canadian Corps was to capture Lens to stop the 6th Army from sending troops north to Flanders.

=== Lens ===
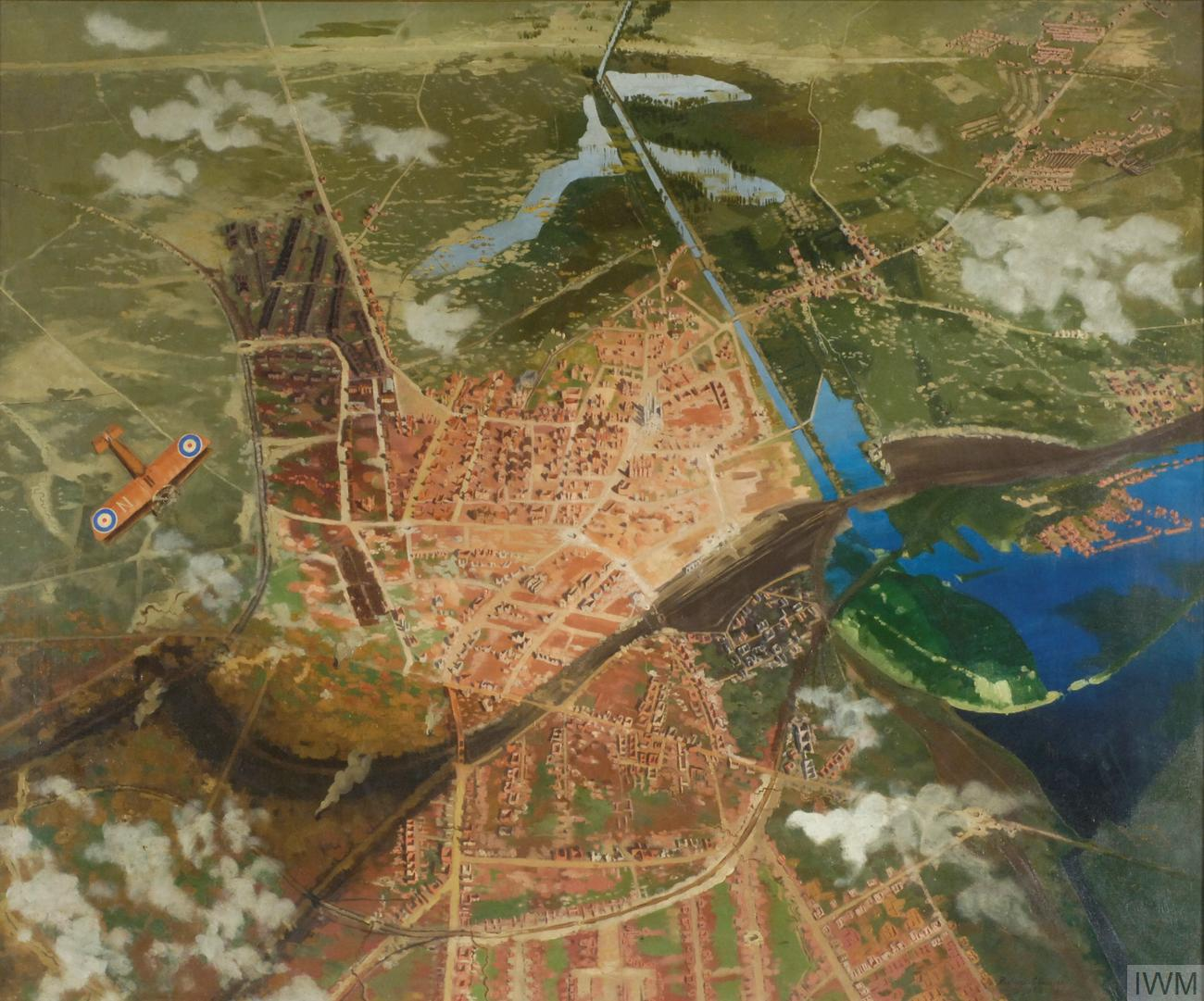
"An Impression of Lens, France, Seen from an Aeroplane- the Anglo-german [sic] Front Line, 1918" (oil on canvas, Richard Carline Art.IWMART2661)

From Vimy Ridge the ground declines about 300 yd (270 m) into the Douai Plain; the valley of the Souchez river is about 66 ft (20 m) wide and flows south-west to north-east through the south of the city of Lens. In 1914, the river had several road and rail bridges. By 1917, much of the city was derelict due to years of artillery bombardments, the ruins being natural strongpoints overlooked by crassiers (slag heaps) and several hills, including Hill 70, Hill 65 and Sallaumines Hill forming a shallow, saucer-shaped depression in which the city lay. To the south-east, on terrain that is 82 to 148 ft (25 to 45 m) above sea level, Sallaumines Hill rises to 180 ft (55 m). On the west side of Lens is Hill 65 (Reservoir Hill) north of the Souchez, which is steep-sided and gives a fine view of the city.

To the north-west, on the east side of the Lens–Bethune road, is a hill about 230 ft (70 m) high with the suburb of Cité St Pierre on top. Hill 70 is north of the city and has a flat top, giving a fine view of the city and the ground to the north and east. The hill slopes gently towards Lens and there is a shallow depression between it and Cité St Pierre. The slopes of Hill 70 towards Cité St Auguste are steeper. Lens, Hill 70, Sallaumines and Sallaumines Hill to the south-east and their commanding views over the area and the city, fell under German control in October 1914, during the Race to the Sea. In September 1915, the British overran the hill during the Battle of Loos but it was recaptured by the Germans.

=== Local operations ===
Horne began to make plans for the capture of Lens during the Third Battle of the Scarpe (3–4 May). Horne wanted the Canadian Corps to continue its operations east of Vimy Ridge to capture Méricourt and La Coulotte, which would endanger the German defences of Sallaumines Hill, south-east of Lens, as I Corps (Lieutenant-General Arthur Holland) north of the Souchez, with twelve tanks, captured Hill 65 (Reservoir Hill) and Hill 70. The attacks would envelop Lens on three sides and give forward observation officers (FOO) sight of the German defences in the city, potentially to force the 6th Army to retire without the need for a frontal attack. In May, Holland had surveyed the I Corps front, noted the importance of Hill 70 and that the Germans would make great efforts to re-capture it.

German counter-attacks could only be resisted if plenty of reserves and much artillery support were made available. Deliberate attacks to capture the high ground around Lens would meet the goals of the First Army despite its limited means. In May and early June, First Army units conducted eighteen raids and minor actions, moving the front line slowly eastwards over the Douai Plain. By 6 June, the First Army had captured all the high ground in the area, except that around Lens. I Corps was west of the city from the Souchez north to Hill 65 (Reservoir Hill), through Cité St Theodore and along the ridge of the 70-metre hill to the north of Cité St Pierre.

On 9 June Arthur Currie, the 1st Canadian Division commander, was promoted to command the Canadian Corps. On 10 June, Holland told Horne that only the capture of Hill 70 was important and suggested inflicting mass casualties by raids, bombardments and gas attacks, to create the impression that a big attack was imminent. The defenders would be kept guessing and have to move more troops and artillery to the hill, despite the inevitable losses. Horne doubted that the army had sufficient men and artillery for the task and arranged for the 46th (North Midland) Division, on the right of I Corps, to make preparations to take Hill 70 and the vicinity but only if reinforcements from GHQ were forthcoming.

While waiting, I Corps would capture Hill 65 and to south of the Souchez, the right flank divisions of the Canadian Corps and XIII Corps to the south would prepare to attack from Gavrelle to Oppy, Fresnoy, Acheville and Mėricourt, digging jumping-off trenches to simulate a threat to Lens from the south. The real attack was to come from the left flank of the Canadian Corps towards Sallaumines Hill and the east end of Avion. Success would trap the Germans in Lens between Sallaumines Hill to the south and Hill 70 to the north. If the 6th Army did not retire, the preparations by I Corps at Hill 70 would make it impossible to predict from which direction the next attack would come.

==== Affairs south of the Souchez ====
To create a threat to Lens, Horne intended that XIII Corps on the southern flank would attack to reach better positions between the villages of Gavrelle and Oppy by advancing the front line for 200–500 yd (180–460 m) on a 2,300 yd (1.3 mi; 2.1 km) front. The 4th Canadian Division on the left flank of the Canadian Corps south of the Souchez River (a tributary of the Deûle) and the 46th (North Midland) Division on the right of I Corps, north of the river, were to attack on a front of 4,800 yd (2.7 mi; 4.4 km) to eliminate a German salient from Avion to the west end of Lens and to occupy Hill 65 (Reservoir Hill). I Corps was to plan for an attack on Hill 70 with the 6th Division on the left (northern) flank. Horne expected that the operations would take place in early July but found that much of the best heavy artillery was to be sent to Flanders and brought forward the date to 28 June. The plans were reduced in scope; the XIII Corps scheme was retained but the attack either side of the Souchez was limited to the capture the German front line west of Avion and Hill 65; the Hill 70 plan was postponed.

The morning of 28 June was dull, humid and storm clouds appeared in the south during the afternoon. The First Army artillery, assisted by Third Army guns en route to Flanders, began a bombardment along the 14 mi (23 km) army front from Gavrelle northwards to Hulluch. The simulation of a much bigger attack on Lens was enhanced by lightning, thunder and a downpour, which began at 7:10 p.m. when the infantry advance began. The adjacent brigades of the 31st Division and the 5th Division had been bombarded in their jumping-off trenches at 5:30 p.m. and had suffered 200 casualties before the advance began. The survivors moved so fast that when a German counter-barrage fell on no man's land three minutes later, the British were on the far side and suffered no harm. The attackers suffered few casualties, took 200 prisoners and counted 280 dead German soldiers. Gavrelle Mill and a new line was consolidated, despite the rainstorm, from which the areas to the north-east and east around Neuvireuil and Fresnes could be observed, along with Greenland Hill to the south-west.

==== Capture of Avion ====
Orders from the First Army HQ reached Currie on 12 June, who replied with a suggestion that the capture of Hill 65 was tactically desirable to gain observation over Lens and to deprive the Germans of reciprocal observation of the British rear. The capture of Avion could be replaced by a raid, to avoid the casualties of a permanent occupation. Preparations for attacks towards Avion would be more meaningful to German observers than the attack which followed. The suggested alternative was not well received by Major-General (Warren) Hastings Anderson, the First Army chief of staff, because one purpose of the operation was to threaten Lille, which could only occur with the capture of Lens after the attack on Avion. The Canadian operation was a stage in the army plan, to be followed by an attack or feint towards Sallaumines Hill. A few days later, more artillery was transferred to Flanders and the Hill 70 attack was postponed.

Further north, opposite the 4th Canadian Division and 46th (North Midland) Division, the German 56th Division had moved into reserve on 22 June to replace a division transferred to Flanders. The line-holding division (Stellungsdivision) had orders to retire from the salient to the Avion–Lens railway if pressed. The western slopes of Hill 65 had been occupied by the British on 24 June after a German retirement and patrols pushed forward towards Avion Trench, which was occupied early on 28 June. The 46th (North Midland) Division and the 4th Canadian Division made ready to resume their advance when the army barrage began at 7:10 p.m. Most of Avion, Éleu-dit-Leauwette and the eastern slope of Hill 65 was captured as the 3rd Canadian Division formed a defensive flank along the Arleux–Avion road, joining with the 4th Canadian Division in Avion. Rain and flooding from the Souchez stopped patrols from probing the German main line of resistance in the north-eastern part of Avion and along a railway embankment about 600 further on.

== Prelude ==
=== First Army ===
The Canadian Corps had the 1st, 2nd and 4th Canadian divisions for the attack and the 3rd Canadian Division in reserve. Artillery planning was delegated to Major Alan Brooke who had two-hundred and forty 18-pounder field guns and seventy-eight 4.5-inch howitzers of the Canadian Corps field artillery, 31 of the 18-pounders being unusable due to barrel-wear. I Corps contributed twelve more 18-pounders and XIII Corps eighteen. Brooke also had 38 batteries of heavy siege howitzers consisting of twenty 9.2-inch howitzers, twenty 8-inch howitzers, eighty 6-inch howitzers, forty-two 60-pounder guns and two 6-inch guns. The British contributed 28 batteries but approximately 25 per cent of the heavy artillery for the operation was of dubious value due to barrel wear. Twenty batteries were in three Heavy Artillery Groups (HAGs) for destructive bombardment, and 18 batteries in three HAGs for counter-battery-fire, four British and two Canadian. (Note: From 1916, siege batteries were affiliated temporarily to a HAG and HAGs were sent to corps as necessary.)

=== 6th Army ===
The 6th Army was responsible for the defence of the area between Lille and Cambrai, Lens being about halfway between. The town was an important railway junction and after the Battle of Arras, earlier in 1917, had become a salient in the German defences. Hill 70 and the vicinity was held by the 7th Division, part of Gruppe Loos, the headquarters of IV Corps. (The German army had begun to use corps headquarters as territorial command units, rather than of a permanent complement of divisions, during the Battle of the Somme.) Lens was garrisoned by the 11th Reserve Division in Gruppe Souchez (VI Corps). In anticipation of an attack, Army Group Crown prince Rupprecht had moved the 4th Guard Division and the 220th Division into the 6th Army area in reserve. The divisions in reserve rehearsed reinforcement and counter-attacks with the two front divisions, Below having written of an expected Canadian (Angriffstruppe) attack on 15 July. (Note: Adjacent units provided supporting artillery fire and the 49th Reserve Division, 39th Division and the 240th Division moved into reserve at times between 20 and 25 August. Tim Cook wrote that the 185th Division also participated in the battle.)

=== Plan ===
On 7 July, due to a lack of artillery, Currie was ordered to take over more of the line to the north and to attack the objectives west of Lens not taken by the 46th (North Midland) Division on 29 June and 2 July. In the south the Canadian Corps was to attack beyond Avion to a railway embankment, ready to advance to Sallaumines Hill. Soon afterwards, GHQ announced that more artillery would be forthcoming and Horne met the corps commanders on 10 July; Currie wanted to make the main effort north of the Souchez, the Canadian Corps taking responsibility for the front from Avion to Hill 70. Horne agreed and on 11 July, Currie issued the first orders for the attack. The Canadian plan for 30 July used the I Corps plan for the abortive June attack as a basis; the scheduled attack to the embankment east of Avion was to go ahead, to obtain a good jumping off point for an advance on Sallaumines Hill, to mislead the defenders. From 11 to 19 July, Canadian Corps intelligence discovered that German dispositions had changed. A third defensive position had been completed along the northern outskirts of the city, from Cinnabar Trench along Nun's Alley, Norman Trench, Hugo Trench to Bois Hugo, beyond the objectives given to Currie on 10 July. The position had three thick belts of barbed wire, a light railway for supply and eleven strongpoints with fields of fire into Commotion Trench, the final Canadian objective. The new position was judged to have become the main German defence line.

Local planning map for the battle

From Hill 70, Lens and the Douai plain were overlooked and Currie believed that the Germans would commit troops that they could ill-afford to lose, to regain a position that they dare not abandon. Artillery observers on the hill could defeat German counter-attacks with accurate artillery-fire. The hill was to be occupied quickly and strongpoint defensive positions were to be established around the 48 Vickers machine guns allocated to each brigade. Small-arms and artillery firepower would defeat German counter-attacks and inflict as many casualties as possible. The 1st Canadian Division and the 2nd Canadian Division were to attack on a front of 4,000 yd (2.3 mi; 3.7 km) to a depth of 1,500 yd (1,400 m) and capture the main German defensive positions on the eastern (reverse) slope of Hill 70. In the first stage, the first objective of the attackers was the German front-line, the second objective (blue line) was the German second position on the crest of the hill and the third objective (green line) was the German third line, on the far slope, about 1,500 yd (1,400 m) from the start line. The 3rd Canadian Infantry Brigade of the 1st Canadian Division would attack north of Hill 70 and the 2nd Canadian Infantry Brigade would attack the summit. The 4th and 5th Canadian Infantry Brigades of the 2nd Canadian Division would attack the ruins of suburbs Cité St Édouard, Cité St Laurent and Cité St Émile directly south of the hill.

By 16 July, the 1st Canadian Division infantry had transferred from the south-west of Lens to the north-western fringe of Hill 70. On 22 July, the divisional artillery arrived and by 25 July was in position from the south of Liévin to Bully-Grenay, among mine workings, slag heaps and ruined villages, many next to light rail lines, the Canadians having inherited the preliminary work done by I Corps. Wire cutting had been going on since 11 July but there was no time for the fifteen-day preliminary bombardment laid down in the artillery plan of 11 July. On 26 July the last orders were issued and a document "Canadian Corps Scheme of Operations" by Percy Radcliffe, the Brigadier-General, General Staff (BGGS), set 30 July as the date, to coincide with the Flanders Offensive. Heavy rains reduced the area to a swamp and grounded the RFC, which was supposed to be observing the progress of the bombardment. Some guns were late arriving and others had too many defects to use for wire cutting. The attack was postponed and despite the deplorable state of many of the guns, the bombardment continued into August and several creeping barrages were fired to provoke German counter-barrages and reveal German gun positions. The 15th Heavy Artillery Group, 50th Heavy Artillery Group and the 2nd Canadian Heavy Artillery Group bombarded German gun positions revealed by aerial photographs, flash spotting and sound ranging, neutralization being more effective than destruction.

==== Artillery ====
For the attack, two-hundred and four 18-pounders and forty-eight 4.5-inch howitzers were to fire a creeping barrage. The 1st Canadian Division front had seventy-two 18-pounders from the 1st and 3rd Canadian divisional artillery and thirty field guns from the British, 18 from the 14th Army Brigade, Royal Field Artillery (RFA), six from the 53rd Battery and six from the 112th Battery. The 2nd Canadian Division had its thirty-six divisional 18-pounders and another 76 British guns, thirty-six 18-pounders of the 46th (North Midland) divisional artillery, twelve 18-pounders of the 179th Army Field Brigade and another 18 from the 120th, 165th and 317th batteries. All of the 4.5-inch howitzers were from the 2nd Canadian divisional artillery, making sixty Canadian and 76 British guns. The attack had 318 field guns and howitzers, with 164 siege guns and howitzers, with 300,000 18-pounder shells, 150,000 4.5-inch and more than 250,000 heavy artillery rounds. The Canadian Corps Heavy Artillery HQ had the 63rd and 64th Heavy Artillery Groups (HAG) with eight siege batteries each and the Canadian Heavy Artillery Group with five, for wire cutting and trench destruction. Barrel wear and general unreliability meant that about half of the 18-pounders could not be used in the preliminary bombardment. About a hundred and sixty-five 18-pounders were to fire the first layer of the creeping barrage, with the infantry advancing about 75 yd (69 m) behind. To make it harder for the German artillery to bombard the infantry by following the creeping barrage, the rest of the 18-pounders and some 4.5-inch howitzers were to fire a barrage 200 yd (180 m) further forward; 6-inch and 9.2-inch howitzers were to fire 100 to 200 yd (91 to 183 m) beyond the second barrage line.

The 15th, 50th and 2nd Canadian HAGs had 111 guns, from 60-pounder guns to 9.2-inch howitzers and four super heavy 12-inch guns and one 15-inch howitzer. The 12-inch guns had the ammunition for eighty rounds per-day-per-gun for fifteen days. High explosive, gas and shrapnel shells were to be fired at German gun positions revealed by RFC reconnaissance photographs and the flash-spotters and sound rangers, to kill gunners and supply horses. One report had the 6th Army artillery in nine groups of 70–80 guns, half of them field guns and half of them heavy. On the eve of the attack, the counter-batteries claimed that forty of 102 German guns had been knocked out. Many of the field guns were beyond the range of Hill 70 but I Corps on the northern (left) flank and XIII Corps on the southern (right) flank were to induce German guns to reply to harassing fire. The counter-batteries were also to be used to destroy German counter-attacks and soon after zero hour, guns from the bombardment HAGs were to join in with the counter-battery HAGs against German infantry counter-attacks. Forward Observation Observers were to accompany the Canadian infantry and establish observation posts connected to the rear with telephones, wireless and visual signalling equipment to direct the artillery.

==== Gas ====
By 1917, gas was delivered by shell, the substances being classed as lethal, harassing and persistent; lethal types were chlorine, phosgene and diphosgene, the phosgene types having little colour or smell. Harassing gases were non-lethal and included tear gas to compel the opponents to wear their gas masks. Catching troops not wearing gas masks with a lethal concentration of gas was difficult but phosgene bombardments could cause casualties, slow the completion of tasks and tire the victims. The Canadians collected 15,000 4.5-inch and 60-pounder gas shells for the operation. Before the attack, the Royal Engineers bombarded the German defences with 3,500 drums (46 long tons (47 t)) of gas) fired from Livens Projectors. Two prisoners of Infantry Regiment 156 said that their companies with 136 men had suffered 49 gas casualties. A prisoner from Infantry Regiment 22 said that two companies had suffered 90 gas casualties.

==== Machine-guns ====
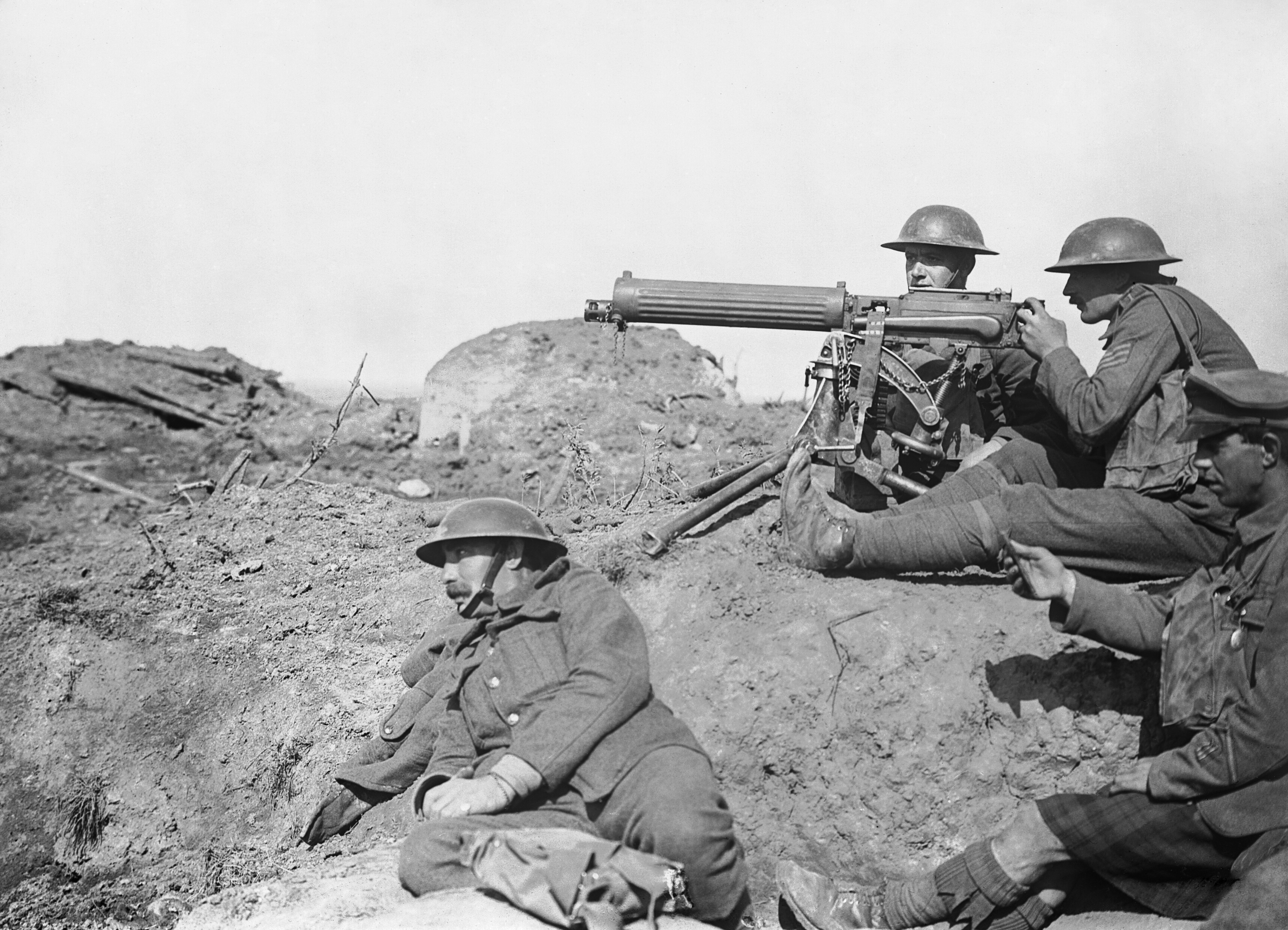
Example of a Vickers gun in action

Sixteen companies from the Canadian Machine Gun Corps with 128 Vickers machine guns and the armoured cars of the Canadian Motor Machine Gun Brigade (CMMGB) with 32 guns, under the command of the divisions, were to supplement the artillery by firing a barrage over the heads of the Canadian infantry. The harassing machine-gun fire was to impede the movement of German troops and supplies, with targets engaged by at least four guns. The Vickers guns were supplied with 20,000 bullets per gun per day, to fire day and night, to make it more difficult for German troops to repair their defences and put out more barbed wire. The cars of the CMMGB drove back and forth behind Canadian lines and from mid-July to early August fired 2,694,700 rounds, including the static guns about ten million rounds were fired before the Canadian attack. When the hill was captured, 48 Vickers guns were to be dug in, one for every 35 yd (32 m) of front, guarded by several infantry sections.

==== Royal Flying Corps ====
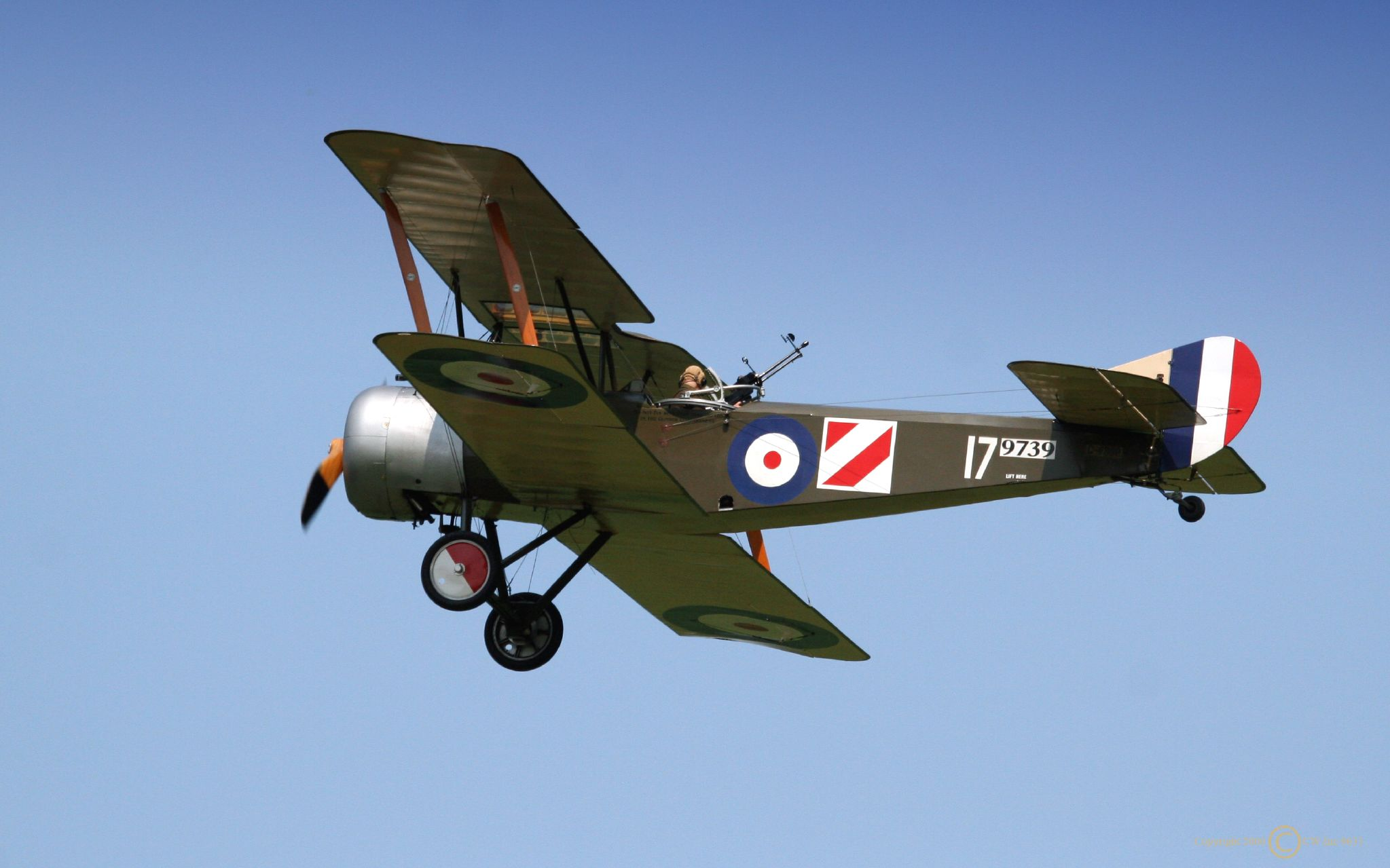
Photograph of a Sopwith 1½ Strutter (2006)

The Canadian Corps had 16 Squadron (BE2cs), 40 Squadron (Nieuport 17s) and 43 Squadron (Sopwith 1½ Strutters) RFC in support and the Sopwith Camels of 8 (Naval) Squadron, Royal Naval Air Service for high patrols over the battlefield. An advanced landing ground at Petit Sains was made ready for 43 Squadron 1½ Strutters to mount continuous counter-attack reconnaissance patrols. Formations of three 1½ Strutters were to observe an area 7,000 yd (4.0 mi; 6.4 km) wide and 1,500 to 2,500 yd (0.85 to 1.42 mi; 1.4 to 2.3 km) deep, that counter-attacking German troops would have to traverse. The 1½ Strutter crews were to report their observations by wireless to the Canadian Corps and HAG headquarters, then attack with their machine-guns any German artillery or concentrations of troops seen at bottlenecks. Contact patrols to mark the progress of the Canadian infantry were to be flown by the B.E.2c crews of 16 Squadron.

On 9 August, six Nieuport 17s of 40 Squadron shot down the six German observation balloons along the Hill 70–Lens. German artillery observation was obstructed but the attack made the Canadian interest in the area obvious. For the two days and nights before the attack, 10 Squadron, 25 Squadron (DH.4s) and 27 Squadron (Martinsyde Elephants) bombed railway junctions, airfields and billets. In earlier battles, British fighters patrolling at height to engage German fighters had not been able to see low-flying, camouflaged German aircraft, which flew artillery-observation and ground attack sorties without interference. Six Nieuport 17s of 40 Squadron moved to an advanced landing ground at Mazingarbe, about 5 mi (8.0 km) behind the front and a ground station was established on the heights west of Loos. When observers spotted a German aircraft at low altitude, a wireless message was sent to Mazingarbe for a Nieuport 17 to be sent up to engage the German aircraft. A letter-code on white canvas sheets containing the location of German aircraft could be laid on the ground for an airborne fighter pilot to read.

==== Deceptions ====
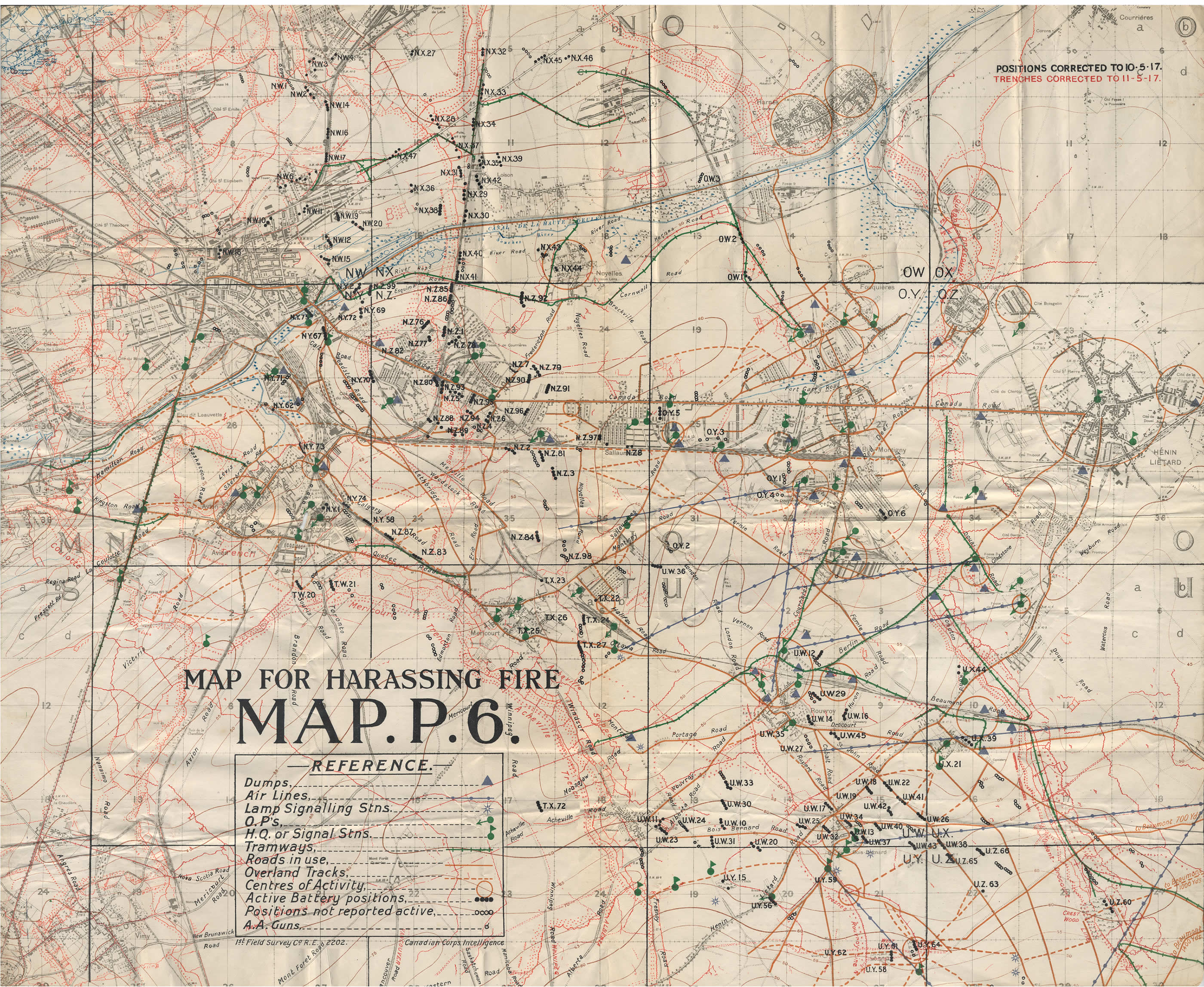
Artillery map of the Lens area, marking locations to bombard with harassing fire

By 16 July, the Canadian Corps had redeployed for the attack on Hill 70; the 1st Canadian Division had taken over from I Corps to the north-west of the hill, and the Canadian Corps occupied a line from the Souchez River northwards to just beyond Hill 70. To deceive the Germans about the place and size of the attack and to disguise Canadian preparations, the XIII, Canadian, I and XI Corps began to conduct larger raids in battalion strength, on most nights from the middle of July, along with gas discharges along the front. Towards the end of the month, raids and bombardments on the army front increased, XI Corps to the north raided nightly, I Corps conducted destructive and wire-cutting bombardments at night and bombarded the German front with machine-guns and mortars during the day; XIII Corps conducted similar operations on the right (southern) army flank.

In late July, the 9th Canadian Brigade conducted a feint on Lens by engaging units of the German 36th Reserve Division at Méricourt Trench. Bad weather led to the attack on Hill 70 being postponed from late July until mid-August. In the interim, special companies of the Royal Engineers augmented the regular level of bombardment by firing 3,500 gas drums from Livens Projectors and 900 gas shells into Lens by 15 August. The artillery neutralized 40 out of an estimated 102 German batteries in the area by zero hour, partly using the technique of predicted fire using datum points and calibrated guns for the first time, which greatly improved the accuracy of the artillery. Troops were rotated through the reserve area to conduct training and rehearsals in preparation for the assault. On the northern (left) flank, the 46th (North Midland) Division made a diversionary attack north of the hill, with poison gas discharges, artillery bombardments and the preparation of dummy tanks and troops on the two nights before the attack, to be exposed to view at zero hour.

== Battle ==
=== 15 August ===
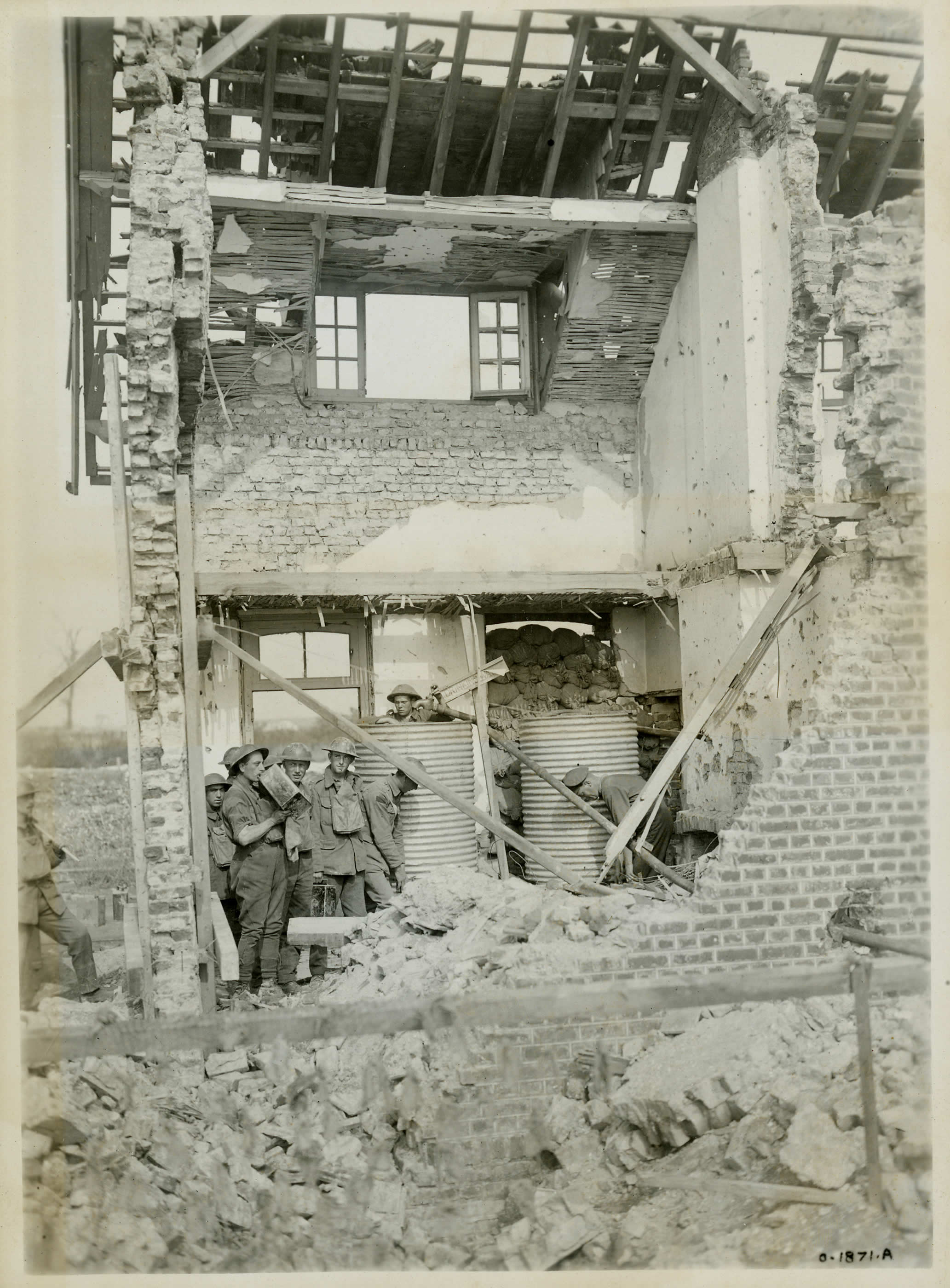
A ruined house west of Lens, used to shelter water tanks

During the night of 14/15 August the Canadian infantry assembled in their jumping-off points; harassing fire from German artillery continued but with no particular intensity. The Germans had moved up reserves on the previous night in anticipation of an attack and the main assembly of Canadian troops was detected by 3:00 a.m. At 4:25 a.m. the Canadian creeping barrage began and the infantry advanced, some troops having left their trenches early to avoid the usual German counter-barrage as soon as the attack began. At 4:26 a.m. Special Companies RE fired 400 drums of oil from Livens Projectors, which dropped into the German defences in Cité St Élisabeth, creating a smoke-screen and then began an hour-long smoke bombardment from 4-inch Stokes mortars. Artillery Forward Observation Officers moved forward with the infantry and artillery-observation aircraft flew overhead sending 240 calls for artillery fire by wireless that day.

In the 1st Canadian Division area, 4 Special Company RE fired mortars and Livens Projectors against the left flank of the attack as a deception and to shield the attack front from observers on higher ground several miles to the north. On the right (southern) flank in the 4th Canadian Division area, a Special Company used Livens Projectors to fire 200 gas cylinders into German positions around Avion. After four minutes, the creeping barrage began to move in 100 yd (91 m) increments, keeping about 25 per cent of the ground to be crossed under bombardment. Vickers gunners fired a machine-gun barrage at maximum range then gradually fired shorter towards the German positions. The Canadian infantry reached the blue line, 600 yd (550 m) forward in twenty minutes and paused to dig in. The advance began again and reached the final objective (red line) at 6:00 a.m. German resistance was determined and the Canadians used Lewis guns to pin down the German infantry as rifle and bombing sections attacked from a flank. On the southern (right) flank, the 4th Canadian Division diversion succeeded and with fewer guns in support, the German artillery reply was more effective than further north. The 12th Canadian Infantry Brigade anticipated the German artillery bombardment and the Canadians took cover in deep shelters at the edge of Lens, the brigade suffering fewer than 24 casualties during the first day.

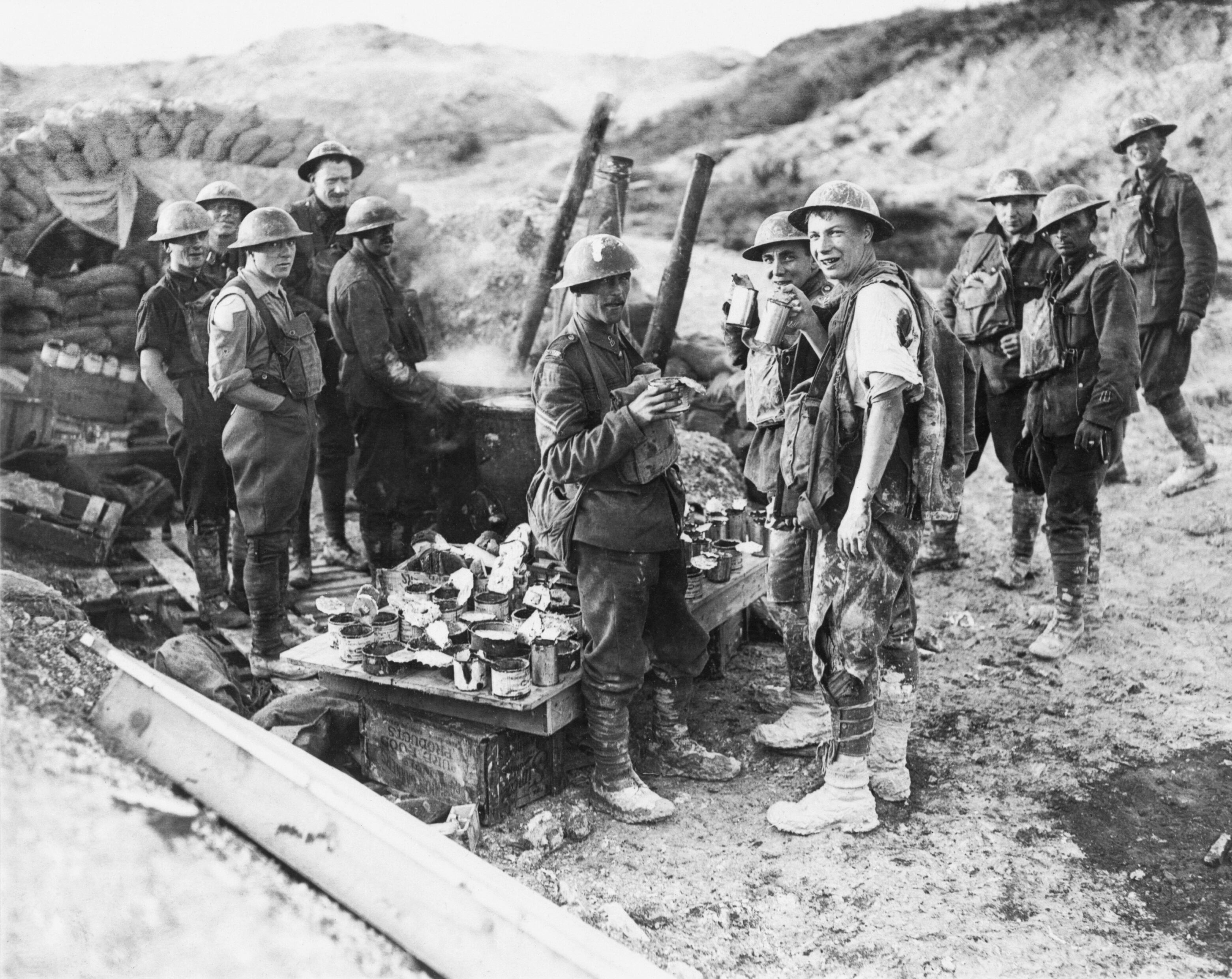
Canadians "100 yards from Boche lines" during the attack on Hill 70

The four attacking Canadian brigades began to consolidate as soon as they reached their objectives and each brigade dug in 48 Vickers guns in its section of the blue line. Connections to the artillery were established by observers with field telephones, wireless and signal lamps and the artillery changed from bombardment and creeping barrage fire to be ready to fire SOS barrages against German counter-attacks. At about 8:15 a.m. the 4th Guard Division began the first German attack, having been seen assembling in Cité St Auguste. The Germans had to move over about 0.75 mi (1.21 km) of open ground and the Canadian gun-, machine-gun and rifle-fire covered the ground with dead and wounded.

An attack at 12:45 p.m. met the same fate, the few Germans reaching the Canadians being bombed out. German counter-attacks continued and the German artillery still in action tried to support the attacks and shell the Canadian defences. A counter-attack at 1:15 p.m. was prepared by German heavy artillery, which cut many of the field telephone links to the Canadian artillery but some remained operational and several runners got through with messages. The 2nd Canadian Division artillery received the message "Please turn Artillery on" and did, repulsing the attack; the Canadian gunners did the same to another German attempt at 6:00 p.m. Canadian machine-gunners fired all day, seven guns of the 3rd Canadian Machine Gun Company firing 5,000 rounds in a few minutes. (Note: The 3rd Canadian Machine Gun Company fired 271,000 rounds during the battle and the 8th Canadian Machine Gun Company 360,000.)

=== Air operations ===
The Sopwith 1 1/2 Strutters of 43 Squadron received many hits from ground fire but only two were shot down, three crew being wounded; a German aircraft was shot down and others driven off but four more Sopwith 1 1/2 Strutters were too badly damaged to be serviceable for 16 August. One Sopwith attacked troops in Drocourt Trench, another aircraft attacked a transport column near Fouquières, then troops near Annay and in Bois de Quatorze. About 1,600 German infantry behind Bois de Dixhuit, north of Lens, were strafed, then the information was reported from Mazingarbe to the Canadian Corps heavy artillery, which dispersed the German troops. While flying artillery-observation sorties in the afternoon, 16 Squadron aircrew saw four waves of German infantry advancing in the open to counter-attack. The crews called on the Canadian heavy artillery and then attacked with their machine-guns, which "all but annihilated" the German force. From 15 to 17 August, the RFC sent 240 reports of German artillery in action and all were answered by the counter-battery groups.

=== Counter-attacks ===
To prepare for German counter-attacks, the 1st and 2nd Canadian Divisions began to reverse captured trenches and construct strong points immediately after capturing the blue line. Within two hours of the start of the battle, the Germans began using their immediate reserves to mount local counter-attacks (Gegenstoße). Between 7:00 a.m. and 9:00 a.m. on the morning of 15 August, the Germans made four local attacks against Canadian positions. Each attack was repulsed due in large part to the work of forward artillery observers, who could now overlook some of the German positions. On one occasion, a German counter-attack was only repulsed after engaging in hand-to-hand fighting. The Germans rapidly brought up seven additional battalions from the 4th Guards Division and 185th Division to reinforce the eight line battalions. Over the following three days, the Germans counter-attacked 21 times against Canadian positions. A frontal attack against the 2nd Canadian Infantry Brigade on the afternoon of 15 August ultimately failed. A German attack against the 4th Canadian Infantry Brigade re-captured Chicory Trench but the German infantry were expelled later that afternoon.

=== 16–17 August ===
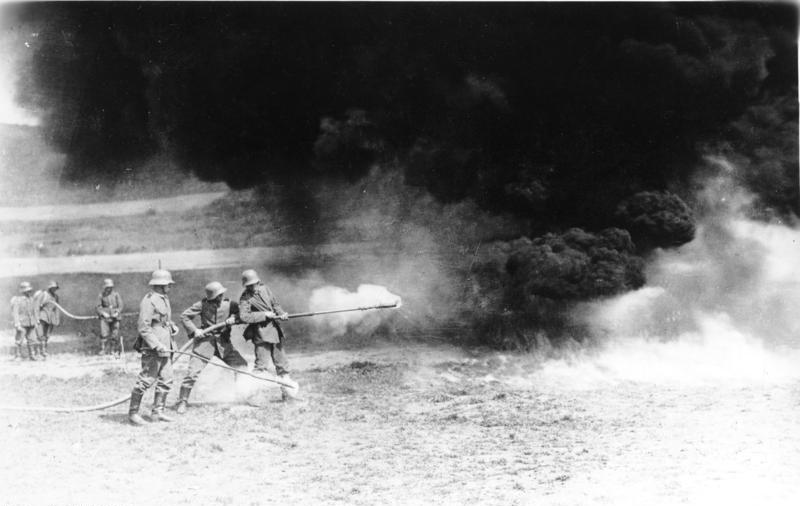
German flamethrower teams temporarily breached the Canadian line.

The morning of 16 August was relatively quiet, with only a few attempts made by small German parties to approach the Canadian lines. After having failed to capture all their objectives the previous day and after several postponements, the 2nd Canadian Infantry Brigade relieved the two front line battalions with the 5th and 10th Canadian battalions, which attacked by short dashes for 400 yd (370 m) down the bare slope and captured the remainder of the final objective. The attack was costly as the Germans opposite were preparing their own counter-attack and hand-to-hand fighting took place at the chalk quarry, which cost the Germans 100 fatal casualties, 100 wounded and thirty prisoners. The Germans began to counter-attack at 7:15 p.m. after a delay but good observation enabled the attacks to be repulsed by massed artillery-, machine-gun and rifle-fire. To the south, the 5th Canadian Battalion retired from the final objective for about 200 yd (180 m) to shell-holes, after suffering many casualties and running short of ammunition. The brigade suffered casualties of 249 men killed, 1,177 men wounded and 225 men missing.

Attempts by the 4th and 11th Canadian Infantry Brigades to eliminate a German salient between Cité St Élisabeth and Lens on 17 August failed and as had been foreseen, the Germans continued to mount determined counter-attacks. The German commanders realized that the Canadian and British artillery would need to be neutralized before a counter-attack could succeed. The Germans began a series of counter-attacks against a chalk quarry under Canadian control outside Cité St Auguste and tried to mislead the Canadian artillery by sending up false flare signals or provoking the infantry to call for unnecessary artillery fire. The Germans stopped wave attacks and counter-attacked with dispersed groups of troops trickling forward using cover; some managed to reach the Canadian defences and fight hand-to-hand. The Germans began to use poison gas in earnest and from 15,000 to 20,000 of the new Yellow Cross shells, containing the blistering agent sulphur mustard, were fired in addition to Green Cross (diphosgene) shells. The positions of the 1st and 2nd Canadian Artillery Field Brigades and the Canadian front line were gassed. The 1st Canadian Division artillery suffered 183 casualties and three batteries suffered direct hits. Many gunners became casualties after gas fogged the goggles of their respirators and they were forced to remove them to set fuses, lay their sights and maintain accurate fire.

=== 17/18 August ===
On the night of 17/18 August, German troops made several attempts to recapture the chalk quarry and Chicory Trench under the cover of gas. All attempts against the chalk quarry failed and only one company of the Reserve Infantry Regiment 55 (on loan to the 11th Reserve Division) managed to breach the Canadian defences at Chicory Trench before being repulsed. German troops employing flamethrowers managed to penetrate the Canadian line north of the quarry on the morning of 18 August before being driven out.

=== 19–20 August ===
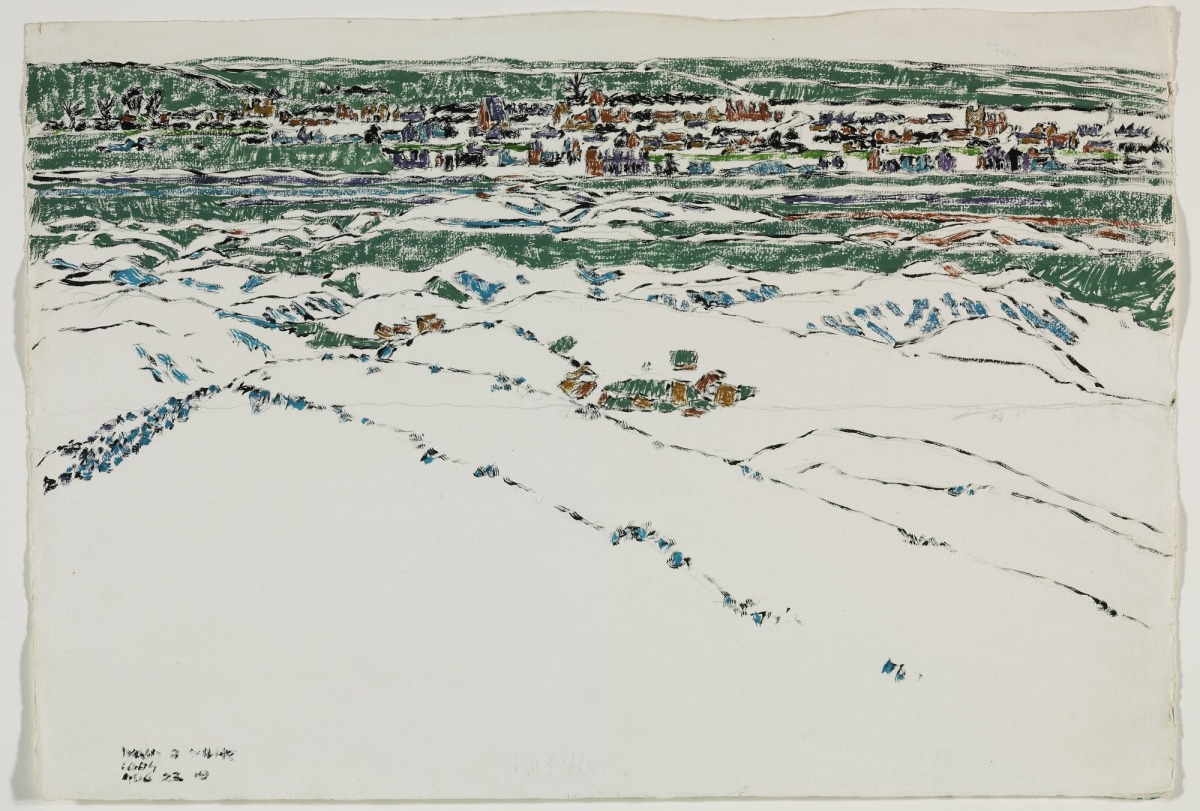
David Milne – "Loos from the Trenches on Hill 70"

The front quietened significantly after the final counter-attack against the chalk quarry. For the Canadian Corps, the following two days consisted largely of consolidation. The front line was drawn back 300 yd (270 m), midway between the original intermediate and final objectives. The 4th Canadian Division slightly advanced its forward posts on the outskirts of Lens and extended its front northward to include the Lens–Béthune road. Currie wished to further improve the position around Hill 70 and ordered an attack against German positions along a 3,000 yd (1.7 mi; 2.7 km) front, opposite the 2nd and 4th Canadian Divisions.

=== 21–22 August (Attack on Lens) ===
The operation was scheduled for the morning of 21 August, the tasks being divided between the 6th Canadian Infantry Brigade on the left and the 10th Canadian Infantry Brigade on the right. The attack was to begin at 4:35 a.m. but the Germans began shelling the Canadian positions at 4:00 a.m. Just before the Canadian attack, the left flank of the 6th Canadian Infantry Brigade was attacked by units of the 4th Guard Division and a battalion of the 220th Division. The forces met between their objectives and fought hand-to-hand and with the bayonet; in the mélée the 6th Canadian Infantry Brigade advance was stopped and the troops forced back to their start line. Communication between the forward units and brigade headquarters had broken down at the beginning of the attack and could not be restored due to the German bombardment, making it all but impossible to co-ordinate the infantry and artillery.

On the right flank, a battalion of the 10th Canadian Infantry Brigade suffered many casualties to the German artillery while assembling for the attack and was met with massed artillery and machine-gun fire, near its objective. Only three small parties, the largest of not more than twenty men, reached their goal. The other two attacking units captured their objectives late in the evening, creating a salient in the 4th Canadian Division line. On the evening of 21 August, three parties went forward to bomb the German position from the flanks but were only moderately successful and an attack on 22 August failed to materialize, due to battalion-level misunderstandings. A brigade reserve unit was ordered to remedy the situation by attacking the Green Crassier slagheap and the mine complex at Fosse St Louis. The attack was repulsed, most of the attackers being killed, wounded or taken prisoner. The Germans held on to the area until the beginning of the final German retreat in 1918.

== Aftermath ==
=== Analysis ===
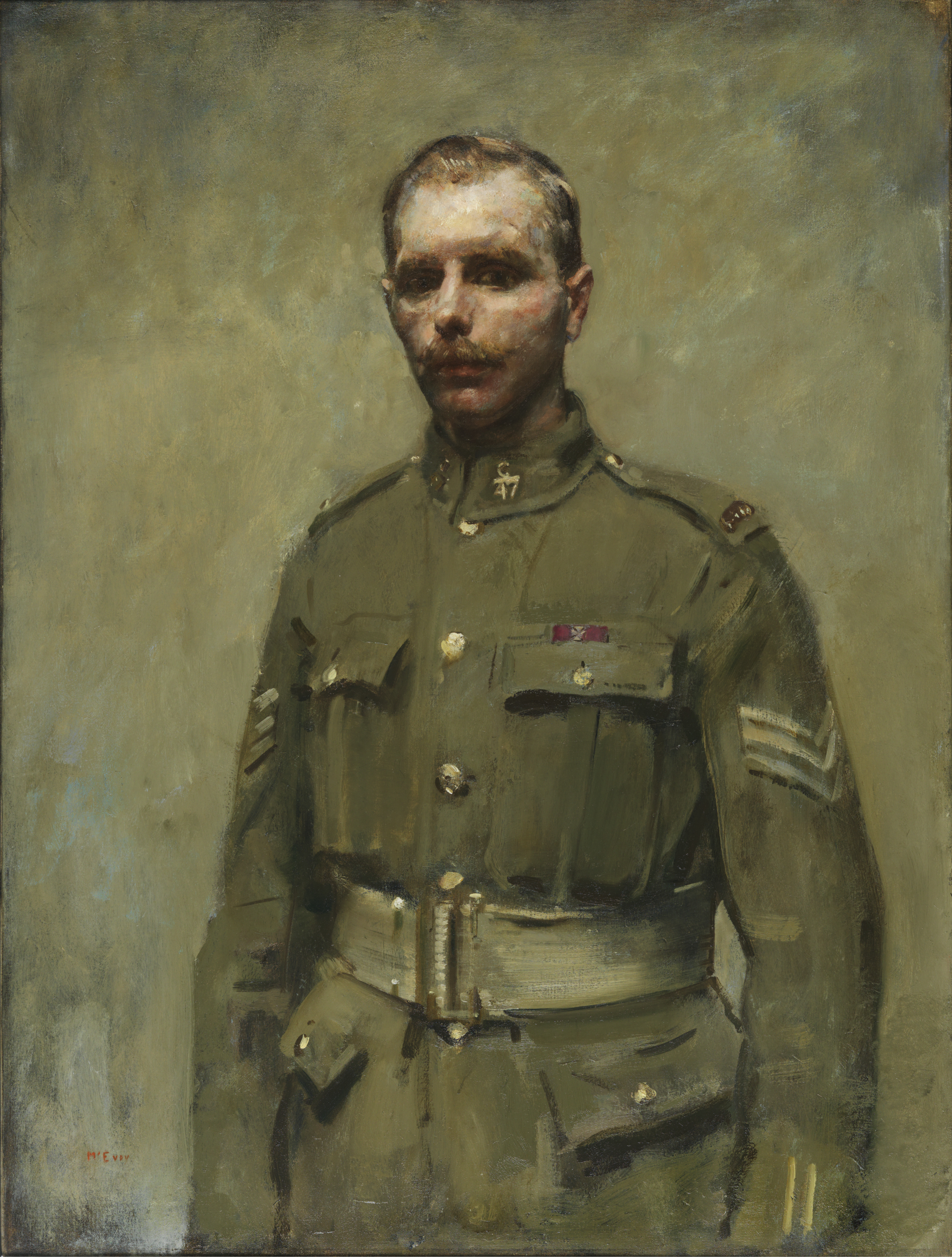
Corporal Filip Konowal, the only Ukrainian Victoria Cross recipient

On 15 August, Haig made a diary note that the attack had gone "very well"; Horne called it "an unqualified success", despite the failure of the 6th Army to retreat and began to plan an attack on Sallaumines Hill for early September. In 1942, the writers of Der Weltkrieg, the German official history (volume XIII), wrote that since mid-July, the German defences at Lens and for about 4.3 mi (7 km) to the north had been under bombardment, which became more intense in August because Haig wanted a diversion from the offensive in Flanders. On 15 August, the Canadian Corps attacked the German positions from Lens to about 1.2 mi (2 km) north, took an important height [Hill 70] for observation and pushed beyond the First Position (I Stellung). Counter-attacks recaptured pockets of ground but the Canadians could not be expelled from I Stellung. Fighting continued intermittently until 24 August but did not lead to more significant changes. The Canadians took over 1,100 prisoners and in their counter-attacks the Germans over 1,002 prisoners.

In 1981, Sydney Wise, author of the Royal Canadian Air Force official history, called the attack at Hill 70 "a demonstration of how a set-piece attack should be carried out". The Germans refrained from attempts to recapture the lost ground at Lens, due to the need to avoid diverting resources from the Third Battle of Ypres in Flanders, the main strategic effort on the Western Front by both sides. In 2009, Tim Cook wrote that the Canadian attack had crushed the defenders by 18 August, 21 German counter-attacks being repulsed. The Canadian plan had succeeded but had depended on the determination of the Canadian infantry against equally determined opponents, who suffered approximately 20,000 casualties, against 5,600 Canadian. The attack ended on 25 August and was a considerable victory despite the Germans retaining their hold on Lens. Two German divisions intended for Flanders had been diverted to Hill 70 and the reinforcement plan for the fighting at Ypres had been dislocated. Cook called the battle the most one-sided German defeat apart from the Battle of Messines in June. The attacks into Lens had been "clumsy, hurried affairs" and that the Canadians suffered nearly 4,000 casualties from 21 to 25 August. The frontal attacks on 21 and 23 August were rash and demonstrated that Currie lacked experience; Cook placed blame on Watson and Hilliam, the latter of whom should have been sacked.

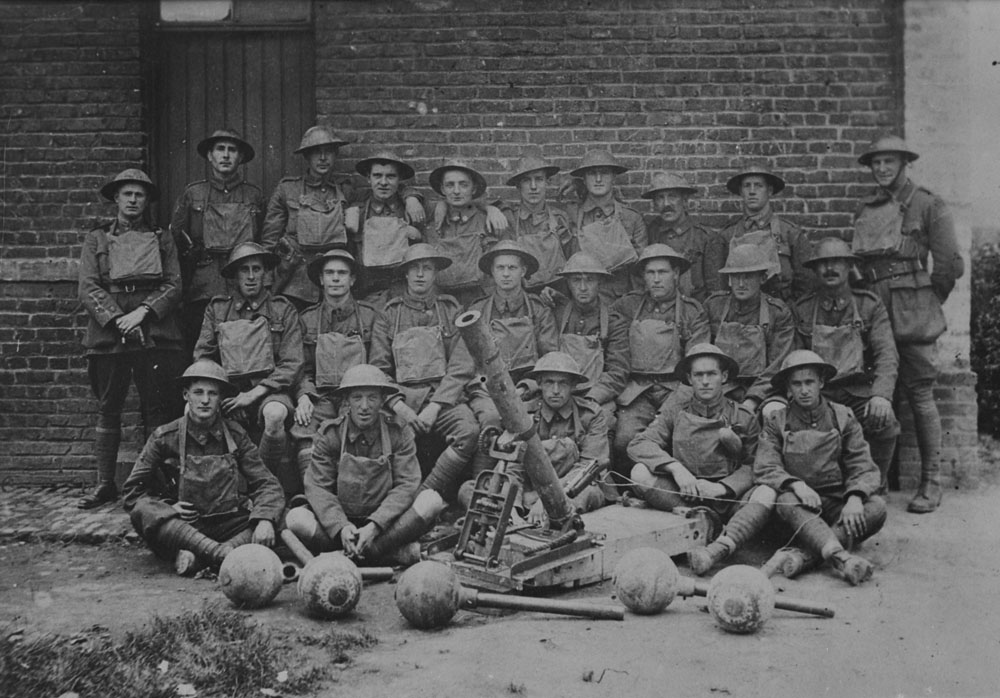
A Canadian trench mortar battery after the battle

In 2016, Robert Foley wrote that Army Group Crown Prince Rupprecht and the 6th Army headquarters thought that the Canadian advance had been stopped by 16 August. Below wrote in his diary that more than ten attacks by the Canadians, "the best English [sic] troops", had been repulsed. The Canadian attack had been stopped because the "English" lacked the flexibility to exploit success, a criticism that had emerged during the Battle of the Somme in 1916. The Canadian attack was seen as a feint to divert German divisions from Flanders and the army group ordered the 6th Army to fight with its own resources, including the seven divisions in army reserve. The 4th Guard Division and the 220th Division acted as Eingreifdivisionen on 15 August and with the existing divisions, conducted most of the German defence.

Once the German counter-attack in 15 August had failed, the attempt to recapture Hill 70 was abandoned and counter-attacks were restricted local efforts to repulse Canadian attacks and for tactical improvements to the German defences. Two divisions were moved from reserve to replace the 4th Guard Division and the 220th Division, three more divisions in reserve remaining available to the 6th Army. No forces were transferred to Lens from Flanders or anywhere else and no divisions were sent to Flanders from 15 to 25 August. Foley wrote that the 1st Guard Reserve Division had been included in some accounts but that neither Below or other German sources from the time refer to it; Foley also wrote that Canadian sources mention the 185th Division in interrogation reports. In 2017, Andrew Rawson wrote that the Canadian attack prevented the Germans from transferring five divisions in the Lens area to Flanders.

=== Casualties ===
Around 22 August, the First Army intelligence department estimated that the Germans had suffered 12,000 to 15,000 casualties. In the History of the Great War (1948), the British official historian, James Edmonds wrote that from 15 to 23 August, the 1st Canadian Division suffered 3,035 casualties, 881 being fatal. The Second Canadian Division suffered 2,724 casualties, 763 men being killed and the 4th Canadian Division had 1,432 casualties, including 381 killed. Corps troops and other troops attached to the 1st Canadian Division suffered 105 casualties, a total of 8,418 casualties, 1,389 German troops were taken prisoner. In the Canadian Official History (1962), G. W. L. Nicholson wrote that the Canadians and attached troops suffered 9,198 casualties. In Surviving Trench Warfare (1992) Bill Rawling wrote that the attack on Hill 70 cost the Canadian Corps 3,527 casualties, 1,056 killed, 2,432 wounded and 39 taken prisoner. In the subsequent attacks into Lens, the Canadian Corps suffered another 5,671 casualties increasing the number to 9,198 men in eleven days.

In 2009, Tim Cook wrote that the Canadians suffered 2,000 casualties during the preparations for the attack in the first two weeks of August and 9,198 casualties from 15 to 25 August, 8,677 at Hill 70 and another 521 elsewhere on the Western Front. The Canadians had suffered nearly 4,000 of their casualties from 21 to 25 August. In Capturing Hill 70 (2016 Douglas Delaney and Serge Durflinger eds) Delaney wrote that Tim Cook had remedied a mistake in the Canadian official history which gave Canadian Corps casualties for August rather than for the period 15 to 25 August. In 2016, Robert Foley wrote that German casualties were difficult to measure, the German official history (Der Weltkrieg) volume noting that complete records did not exist. The 7th Division suffered about 2,000 casualties before being withdrawn on 17 August, the 4th Guard Division about 1,200 from 15 to 21 August and that the 220th Division also suffered many casualties, Reserve Infantry Regiment 99 losing 474 men in four days. Foley estimated that the Germans suffered c. 10,000 casualties; Delaney and Durflinger wrote that the lower estimates of German casualties were higher than those of the attackers, an unusual occurrence in the war.

=== Subsequent operations ===
From the rest of August to the beginning of October the front was relatively quiet, with Canadian efforts devoted mainly to preparations for another offensive, although none took place, largely because the First Army lacked sufficient resources for the task. The Canadian Corps was transferred to the Ypres sector in early October in preparation for the Second Battle of Passchendaele. Soon after the battle, Below was transferred to the Italian front, where he took command of the new Austro-German 14th Army. In this capacity, he executed an extremely successful offensive at the Battle of Caporetto in October 1917. General der Infanterie Ferdinand von Quast took over command of the 6th Army until the end of the war.

=== Victoria Cross ===
Six Victoria Crosses, the highest military decoration for valour awarded to British and Commonwealth forces, were awarded to members of the Canadian Corps for their actions during the battle

- Private Harry Brown, 10th (Canadian) Battalion
- Company Sergeant-Major Robert Hanna, 29th (Vancouver) Battalion
- Sergeant Frederick Hobson, 20th (Central Ontario) Battalion
- Corporal Filip Konowal, 47th (British Columbia) Battalion (the only Ukrainian to ever be awarded the Victoria Cross)
- Acting Major Okill Learmonth, 2nd (Eastern Ontario) Battalion
- Private Michael O'Rourke, 7th (British Columbia) Battalion
