= Ranger =

A ranger is typically someone in a law enforcement or military/paramilitary role specializing in patrolling a given territory, called "ranging" or "scouting". The term most often refers to:

- Park ranger or forest ranger, a person charged with protecting and preserving protected parklands and forests
  - National Park Service ranger, an employee of the National Park Service
  - U.S. Forest Service ranger, an employee of the United States Forest Service
  - Ranger of Windsor Great Park, a ceremonial office of the UK
  - Includes the Keepers of Epping Forest who are charged to "range" about the Forest in their duties

Ranger or Rangers may also refer to:

== Arts and entertainment ==
=== Publications ===
- Ranger's Apprentice, a series of novels by John Flanagan
- Ranger Rick, a children's nature magazine published by the US National Wildlife Federation
- Ranger (magazine), a former British comic magazine

=== Fictional entities ===
- Rangers (comics), a Marvel Comics superhero team
- Ranger (Middle-earth), a fictional group of the Dúnedain of the North and South in the Third Age
- Ranger, a character class in many fantasy and science fiction games such as the Ranger in Dungeons & Dragons
- Ranger (Transformers)
- Rangers, fictional warriors in the television series Babylon 5
- Rangers, in Poul Anderson's The Corridors of Time
- Royal Wessex Rangers, a fictional military unit portrayed in Spearhead (TV series)
- Power Rangers, an American franchise built around a live action children's television series
- Pokémon Ranger, a series of action role-playing video games and spinoff of the larger Pokémon franchise
- The Ranger, the main protagonist of Quake

=== Other uses in arts and entertainment ===
- Rangers (band), a Czech pop folk and country band
- Ranger: Simulation of Modern Patrolling Operations, a board game

== Law enforcement/paramilitary ==
=== United States ===
- Arizona Rangers
- California Rangers
- Colorado Mounted Rangers
- New York State Forest Rangers
- Texas Ranger Division
- National Park Service Law Enforcement Rangers
- Colorado Rangers

=== Elsewhere ===
- Newfoundland Rangers, a former Canadian police force
- Pakistan Rangers, a Pakistani paramilitary force
  - Punjab Rangers, branch of Pakistan Rangers in Punjab
  - Sindh Rangers, branch of Pakistan Rangers in Sindh
- Sarawak Rangers, a former Malaysian paramilitary force

== Military ==
=== Asia ===
- Ranger Courses, commando training courses at the Japan Ground Self-Defense Force
- 1st Scout Ranger Regiment, a unit of the Philippine Army
- Royal Ranger Regiment, a unit of the Malaysian Army
- Sarawak Rangers, a unit of the Kingdom of Sarawak
- Thahan Phran or Thai Rangers, a paramilitary light infantry force and auxiliary of the Royal Thai Army
- Royal Thai Army Ranger, part of the Royal Thai Army Special Warfare Command
- Vietnamese Rangers, a unit of the South Vietnamese Army

=== Europe ===
- Army Ranger Wing, the elite special operations forces of the Irish Defence Forces
- 4th Alpini Paratroopers Regiment, a ranger regiment of the Italian Army specializing in mountain combat
- Rangers Battalion (North Macedonia), a special operations force in the Army of the Republic of North Macedonia
- Special Operations Troops Centre, the counter-terrorist and unconventional warfare special forces division of the Portuguese Army, nicknamed Rangers
- Ukrainian Rangers Corps, an elite Special Operations Corps in the structure of the Ukrainian SOF, established in 2024

==== United Kingdom ====
===== Current: =====
- Ranger Regiment (United Kingdom), regular regiment formed 2021, no relation to previous "Rangers" of the Territorial Army
- Sherwood Rangers Yeomanry, a squadron of the Royal Yeomanry

===== Former: =====
- Royal Irish Rangers, a regiment of the British Army until 1992. Soldiers with the rank of Private in the Royal Irish Regiment (since 1992) are given the designation of "Ranger"
- The Rangers (British regiment), a volunteer unit of the British Army, originally formed in 1860
- Connaught Rangers, a Regiment of the British Army, disbanded 1922
- 88th Regiment of Foot (Connaught Rangers), line infantry regiment of the army formed in 1793 and disbanded in 1881
- Adams' Rangers, a unit in the American Revolutionary War
- Butler's Rangers, a unit in the American Revolutionary War
- King's Rangers, a unit in the American Revolutionary War
- Queen's Rangers, a unit in the American Revolutionary War
- Rogers' Rangers, a unit in the French and Indian War
- Burke's Rangers, irregular skirmisher infantry unit formed in 1747 for service in King George's War, disbanded in 1762
- Danks' Rangers, irregular skirmisher infantry unit formed in 1756 for service in the French and Indian War, disbanded in 1762
- Gorham's Rangers, irregular skirmisher infantry unit formed in 1744 for service in King George's War, disbanded in 1762

=== North America ===
- Rogers' Rangers, an 18th-century predecessor to several modern Ranger companies

==== Canada: ====
===== Current: =====
- The Queen's York Rangers (1st American Regiment) (RCAC), a Canadian Army reserve regiment based in Ontario
- Rocky Mountain Rangers, a Canadian Army reserve regiment based in British Columbia
- Canadian Rangers, a sub-component of the Canadian Forces reserve
- Junior Canadian Rangers, a youth organization

===== Former: =====
- Pacific Coast Militia Rangers, irregular World War II volunteer force and a forerunner to the Canadian Rangers
- The Prince of Wales Rangers (Peterborough Regiment)
- The York Rangers, a Canadian Army reserve infantry regiment amalgamated into The Queen's York Rangers (1st American Regiment) (RCAC)
- The Manitoba Rangers, a Canadian Army reserve infantry regiment converted to artillery, now known as the 26th Field Artillery Regiment, RCA
- 23rd Alberta Rangers, a Canadian Army reserve cavalry regiment amalgamated into the 19th Alberta Dragoons (now part of the South Alberta Light Horse)
- 127th Battalion (12th York Rangers), CEF, a World War I unit of the Canadian Expeditionary Force
- 172nd Battalion (Rocky Mountain Rangers), CEF, a World War I unit of the Canadian Expeditionary Force
- 176th Battalion (Niagara Rangers), CEF, a World War I unit of the Canadian Expeditionary Force
- 199th Battalion Duchess of Connaught's Own Irish Rangers, CEF, a World War I unit of the Canadian Expeditionary Force
- 220th Battalion (12th Regiment York Rangers), CEF, a World War I unit of the Canadian Expeditionary Force
- The Rocky Mountain Rangers (1885), a Canadian irregular cavalry / mounted infantry unit that served in the North-West Rebellion of 1885
- Caldwell's Western Rangers, a Canadian militia skirmisher infantry unit in the War of 1812

==== United States: ====
===== Current: =====
- 75th Ranger Regiment, US Special Operations unit
- United States Army Rangers

===== Former: =====
- Goodyear Ranger, a commercial blimp purchased by the U.S. Navy during World War II for use as a training airship
- Georgia Regiment of Horse Rangers, a Continental Army unit in the Revolutionary War
- Hawk Mountain Ranger School, a ground search and rescue school within the Civil Air Patrol, the U.S. Air Force Auxiliary
- Indiana Rangers, a 19th-century mounted militia force
- Knowlton's Rangers, the U.S.'s first espionage organization
- Loudoun Rangers, a Union Army unit in the Civil War
- McNeill's Rangers, a Confederate Army unit in the Civil War
- Missouri Rangers, a 19th-century militia created during War of 1812
- Oregon Rangers, a 19th-century militia
- Terry's Texas Rangers, a Confederate Army unit in the Civil War
- United States Mounted Rangers, serving on the Great Plains, 1832-1833
- United States Rangers in the War of 1812
- Whitcomb's Rangers, a Continental Army unit in the Revolutionary War

== People ==
- Ranger (surname), includes a list of notable people with the surname
- Ranger Bill Miller (1878–1939), American actor
- Ranger Ross (born 1959), American former professional wrestler and former US Army Ranger
- Ranger Suárez (born 1995), Venezuelan baseball pitcher
- Ranger Smith, fictional park ranger in the Yogi Bear cartoon series

== Places ==
=== Communities in the United States ===
- Ranger, Georgia, an unincorporated community in Gordon County
- Ranger, Indiana, an unincorporated community in Perry County
- Ranger, Missouri, an unincorporated community in Dent County
- Ranger, Texas, a city in Eastland County
- Ranger, West Virginia, an unincorporated community in Lincoln County

=== Other places ===
- Ranger Bridge, spanning the Connecticut River between the U.S. states of Vermont and New Hampshire
- Ranger Lake, in Cuyahoga County, Ohio, U.S.
- Ranger Mountains, in Clark County, Nevada, U.S.
- Ranger Peak (disambiguation), several mountains in the US
- Ranger Uranium Mine, a former mine in the Northern Territory of Australia

== Scouting ==
- Ranger (Girl Guide)
- Ranger Award, a Boy Scouts of America award
- Boy Rangers of America, a scouting program

== Sports ==
=== Association football ===
- Rangers F.C., based in Glasgow, Scotland
- Rangers F.C. (disambiguation)

=== Gaelic football ===
- Argideen Rangers GAA, a club in Timoleague
- Brickey Rangers GAA, a club outside Dungarvan
- Carbery Rangers GAA, a club in Rosscarbery
- Crossmaglen Rangers GAC, a club in Armagh
- Laune Rangers GAA, a club in Killorglin
- Nemo Rangers GAA, a club in Cork

=== Baseball ===
- Arizona League Rangers, a minor league team in Surprise, Arizona
- Dallas Rangers, a minor league team in Dallas, Texas
- Dominican Summer League Rangers, a minor league team in the Santo Domingo, Dominican Republic
- Drew Rangers baseball, the team of Drew University in Madison, NJ
- Gastonia Rangers, a minor league team in Gastonia, North Carolina
- Texas Rangers (baseball), a Major League Baseball team in Arlington, Texas
- Toowoomba Rangers, a club in Toowoomba, Queensland

=== Ice hockey ===
- Binghamton Rangers, an American Hockey League team in Binghamton, New York
- Colorado Rangers, a 1987-1988 International Hockey League team in Denver, Colorado
- Denver Rangers, a 1988-1989 International Hockey League team in Denver, Colorado
- Drummondville Rangers, a junior team in Drummondville, Quebec
- Earls Court Rangers, an English National League team in West London, England
- Fort Worth Rangers, played 1941–42 in the AHA, and 1945–49 in the USHL
- Glanbrook Rangers, a Niagara & District Junior C Hockey League team in Glanbrook, Ontario
- Kitchener Rangers, an Ontario Hockey League team in Kitchener, Ontario
- New York Rangers, a National Hockey League team based in the New York City borough of Manhattan
- North York Rangers, a Metro Junior A Hockey League team in North York, Ontario
- South Grenville Rangers, an Eastern Ontario Junior B Hockey League team in South Grenville, Ontario
- Toronto Young Rangers, an Ontario Hockey Association team in Toronto
- Winnipeg Rangers (disambiguation)

=== Rugby ===
- Broughton Rangers, a British rugby league team
- Saddleworth Rangers, a British Rugby league team
- Waitakere Rangers, a New Zealand rugby team

=== US college sports ===
- Northwestern Oklahoma State Rangers, the athletic teams that represent Northwestern Oklahoma State University, in Alva, Oklahoma
- Parkside Rangers, the athletic teams that represent the University of Wisconsin–Parkside, in Somers, Wisconsin

=== Other sports ===
- Dandenong Rangers, an Australian women's basketball team
- München Rangers, an American football team from Munich, Germany
- New Cross Rangers, a British speedway team
- Rangers Sports Events (Lebanon), sports events organized yearly by the Rangers Regiment of the Lebanese army
- Rangers cricket team, a Zimbabwean cricket team
- Madikwe Rangers, South Africa field hockey club

== Transportation ==
=== Air ===
- Ranger Engines, a former aircraft engine company
- Parker 2nd Ranger, a motorglider
- RUAG Ranger, a Swiss unmanned air vehicle
- Vashon Ranger R7, an American light-sport aircraft design

=== Land ===
- Ranger (automobile), a 1968–1976 General Motors (GM) car model
- Cadillac Gage Ranger, an armored truck
- Edsel Ranger, a 1958–1960 American sedan
- Ford Ranger, an American pick-up truck
- Hino Ranger, a Japanese cab-over truck
- Ranger, a series of off-road vehicles by Polaris Industries
- Rickman Ranger, a UK series of GRP kit-cars also produced in Russia by Autokam
- Bush Ranger (car), an Australian four wheel drive buggy
- A type of Rover ticket which allows unlimited travel in the UK for one day

=== Water ===
- Ranger (ship), a list of ships
- Ranger (yacht), a 1930s racing sailboat
- Ranger Boats, for bass fishing
- Ranger Yachts, an American sailboat manufacturer
- Ranger-class tanker, a series of Royal Fleet Auxiliary ships
- HMS Ranger, the name of several Royal Navy ships
- USS Ranger, the name of several U.S. Navy ships
- USC&GS Ranger, an American survey ship
- Ocean Ranger, a semi-submersible mobile offshore drilling unit that sank in 1982

== Other uses ==
- As-Saaffat ("The Rangers"), 37th sura of the Qur'an
- Colorado Ranger, a horse breed
- Ranger (file manager), a free text-based file manager for Unix-like systems
- Ranger (ride), a type of inverted pendulum ride
- Ranger College, a public community college in Ranger, Texas, U.S.
- Ranger program, a series of American uncrewed Lunar space missions
- Royal Rangers, a Christian youth movement

== See also ==
- Power Rangers (disambiguation)
- Range (disambiguation)
- Texas Rangers (disambiguation)
- The Ranger (disambiguation)
