= Rocky Mountain Rangers (disambiguation) =

The Rocky Mountain Rangers are a current infantry unit of the Canadian Forces.

Rocky Mountain Rangers may also refer to:

- Rocky Mountain Rangers (1885), a Canadian light cavalry unit of the North-West Rebellion
- Rocky Mountain Rangers (film), a 1940 Western film
