= Kootenay Brown =

Irish-born Canadian soldier and prospector (1839–1916)

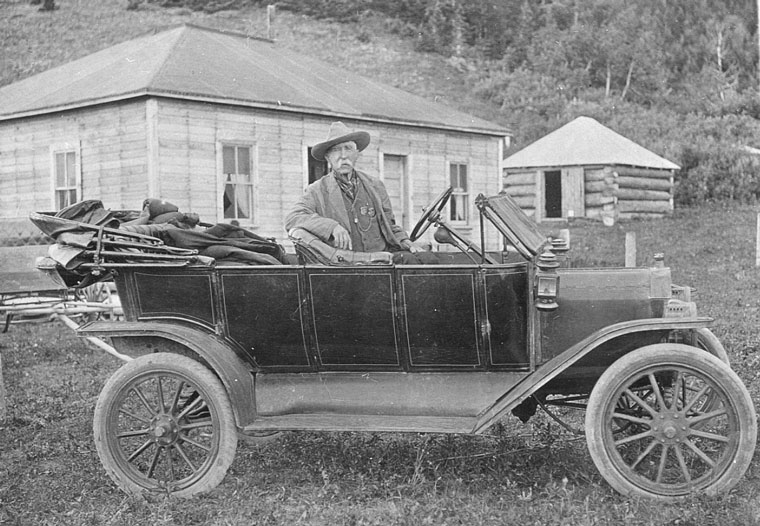
- Born: John George Brown; 10 October 1839; Ennistymon, County Clare, Ireland
- Died: 18 July 1916 (aged 76); Waterton Lakes, Alberta, Canada
- Resting place: Waterton Lakes, Alberta, Canada
- Citizenship: British, Canadian
- Occupations: frontiersman; soldier; army officer; prospector; hunter; trapper; explorer; courier; guide; packer; fishery officer; forest ranger
- Employer(s): British government, Canadian government, self-employed
- Known for: Being a famous mountain men on the Canadian and American Western Frontier
- Spouse(s): Two wives; Olive Lyonnais, and Cheepaythaquakasoon (Isabella)
- Military career
- Allegiance: United Kingdom; Canada
- Branch: British Army; Canadian Non-Permanent Active Militia
- Service years: 1857–1862, 1885
- Rank: Commissioned officer
- Units: 8th (The King's) Regiment of Foot; Rocky Mountain Rangers

John George Brown (10 October 1839 – 18 July 1916), better known as "Kootenai" Brown, was an Irish-born Canadian soldier, prospector, trader, guide, forest ranger, and conservation advocate.

== Early life ==
John George Brown was born and educated in Ennistymon, County Clare, Ireland. Brown was commissioned as a British Army officer in 1857 "without purchase" (a reference to the practice then common of purchasing officers' commissions), joining the 8th Regiment as an ensign. After serving in India from 1858 to 1859, in 1862 he sold his commission and joined the flood of prospectors joining the Cariboo Gold Rush in British Columbia, Canada.

== Frontiersman ==
He proved unsuccessful as a prospector, turning to trapping and then briefly policing, serving as constable in Wild Horse Creek, a tributary of the Kootenay River in the East Kootenay region of southeastern British Columbia (now gone).

In 1865, he moved on, to Waterton Lakes, just east of the Kootenays, being wounded by a Blackfoot on his way to Fort Garry (now Winnipeg), where he settled and became a whisky trader.

Subsequent to that, he worked briefly for a company delivering mail to the United States Army until 1874, during which time he was captured and nearly killed by Sitting Bull in 1869.

After a quarrel and gunfight at Fort Benton, Montana, with "celebrated hunter" Louis Ell, in which Ell was killed, and subsequent trial and acquittal by a territorial jury, Brown returned to his beloved Kootenay, where he settled, building a reputation as a guide and packer.

In the North West Rebellion, he acted as chief scout to the Rocky Mountain Rangers.

Always arguing vigorously for the region's preservation, after the Kootenay Lakes Forest Reserve was established in 1895, Brown became a fishery officer and in 1910, a forest ranger.

He lived to see the reserve expanded into Waterton Lakes National Park, which became contiguous with Glacier National Park in Montana, in 1914.

== Personal life ==
In 1869, Kootenay Brown married a local Métis woman and ultimately made a living bison hunting and wolfing.

Kootenay Brown died in Waterton Lakes, Alberta, Canada and was buried alongside his two wives.

== In popular culture ==
The 1991 movie The Legend of Kootenai Brown starring Tom Burlinson, Raymond Burr and Donnelly Rhodes, provides a loose portrayal of his life.

The Kootenai Brown Pioneer Village in Pincher Creek, Alberta, is named after Kootenai Brown for his contribution to the history of the surrounding area. Kootenai Brown's cabin is also located on site.
