= Ranger (surname) =

Ranger is a surname. Notable people with the surname include:

- Andrew Ranger (born 1986), Canadian racing driver
- Henry Ward Ranger, American artist
- Ivan Ranger, Croatian baroque painter
- Lars Ranger (born 1999), Norwegian footballer
- Mick Ranger, English arms dealer
- Nile Ranger, English footballer who plays for Football League One club Southend United
- Paul Ranger, Canadian professional ice hockey defenceman
- Rene Ranger, New Zealand rugby union player
- Richard H. Ranger, American electrical engineer and inventor
- Rose Ranger, Canadian singer-songwriter
- Scott Ranger, Canadian lacrosse player
- Terence Ranger, (1929–2015) British historian of Africa

== See also ==
- Ranger (disambiguation)
