= Ranger Peak =

Ranger Peak may refer to one of the following mountain peaks:

Each in the United States

- Ranger Peak (California), a mountain in California
- Ranger Peak (Idaho), a mountain peak on the Idaho–Montana border
- Ranger Peak, a mountain in Franklin Mountains State Park in El Paso, Texas
- Ranger Peak (Wyoming), in Grand Teton National Park, Wyoming

== See also ==
- Ranger (disambiguation)
