= Texas Rangers =

Texas Rangers most commonly refers to:

- Texas Ranger Division, an investigative law enforcement agency in the U.S. state of Texas
- Texas Rangers (baseball), an American professional baseball team

Texas Rangers may also refer to:

== Arts and entertainment ==
- Texas Ranger (film), an Italian Western
- Texas Rangers (film), a 2001 American action Western
- The Texas Rangers (1936 film), an American Western
- The Texas Rangers (1951 film), an American Western in color
- The Texas Ranger (film), a 1931 film
- The Texas Ranger (magazine), the undergraduate humor publication of the University of Texas at Austin
- "Texas Rangers" (Boon), a 1987 British TV episode

== Other uses ==
- Texas Rangers (architects), a group of architects at the University of Texas at Austin
- Leucophyllum frutescens, an evergreen shrub sometimes called Texas Ranger

== See also ==
- Ranger, Texas, a city
- Ranger (disambiguation)
- First Regiment of Texas Mounted Rifle Volunteers, or Hays's Texas Rangers
- Tales of the Texas Rangers, 1950s radio and television series
- Terry's Texas Rangers, the popular name of the 8th Texas Cavalry
- Texas City Rangers, a team of the American Basketball Association which began in 2008
- Walker, Texas Ranger, a TV series starring Chuck Norris
