= The Ranger =

The Ranger may refer to:

- The Ranger (film), 2018
- The Ranger (1918 film), a silent western film starring Shorty Hamilton
- A character in Batmen of All Nations comic books

== See also ==
- Ranger (disambiguation)
