= Rangers F.C. (disambiguation) =

Rangers F.C. is an association football club from Glasgow.

Rangers F.C. may also refer to:

== Association football ==
- FC Rànger's, Andorra
- Rangers de Talca, Chile
- Queens Park Rangers F.C., England
- Hong Kong Rangers FC
- Rangers A.F.C., New Zealand
- Enugu Rangers, Nigeria; officially Rangers International Football Club
- Posta Rangers F.C., Kenya
- Rangers W.F.C., women's football team associated with Rangers F.C.
- Rangers F.C. (South Africa)
- Ards Rangers F.C., Northern Ireland
- Banbridge Rangers F.C., Northern Ireland
- Bryansburn Rangers F.C., Northern Ireland
- Carrick Rangers F.C., Northern Ireland
- Glebe Rangers F.C., Northern Ireland
- Killymoon Rangers F.C., Northern Ireland
- Moat Park Rangers F.C., Northern Ireland
- Newington Rangers F.C., Northern Ireland
- Scarva Rangers F.C., Northern Ireland
- Ballymacash Rangers F.C., Northern Ireland
- Lisburn Rangers F.C., Northern Ireland
- Portavogie Rangers F.C., Northern Ireland
- Rathfriland Rangers F.C., Northern Ireland
- Rectory Rangers F.C., Northern Ireland
- Tullyvallen Rangers F.C., Northern Ireland
- Valley Rangers F.C., Northern Ireland

== Other sports ==
- Rangers F.C. (Superleague Formula team), motor racing team associated with Rangers F.C.

== See also ==
- List of association football clubs named Rangers
- Randers FC, similarly spelled Danish football club
- Rangers (disambiguation)
