= Windrider =

- US film poster
- Directed by: Vince Monton
- Written by: Everett De Roche; Bonnie Harris
- Produced by: Paul D. Barron
- Starring: Tom Burlinson; Nicole Kidman; Jill Perryman; Bud Tingwell
- Cinematography: Joseph Pickering
- Edited by: John Scott
- Music by: Kevin Peek
- Production companies: Barron Films; Bush Christmas Productions
- Distributed by: Hoyts Distribution
- Release date: 26 December 1986 (Australia)
- Running time: 92 minutes
- Country: Australia
- Language: English
- Budget: A$2.5 million
- Box office: $19,367

Windrider (alternatively worded as Wind Rider and also known as Making Waves) is a 1986 Australian romantic comedy film directed by Vincent Monton and starring Tom Burlinson, Nicole Kidman, and Bud Tingwell. It was filmed in Perth, Western Australia, Australia.

== Plot ==
Stewart "P.C." Simpson (Burlinson) lives in a magnificent beachfront home and is an enthusiastic windsurfer, indulging his passion for windsurfing daily. His wealthy father (Tingwell) may fault P.C.'s inconsistency in working within the company he owns but can appreciate his son's remarkable abilities on the waves. With the help of his father's company's engineer Howard (Chilvers), P.C. develops a high-tech sailboard for the coming world windsurfing championship. Meanwhile, Jade (Kidman) is a rock singer who starts a relationship with P.C., but as their romance blooms, sport, friends, and the upcoming championship become secondary.

== Cast ==
- Tom Burlinson as Stewart P.C. Simpson
- Nicole Kidman as Jade
- Bud Tingwell as Stewart Simpson Senior
- Jill Perryman as Miss Dodge
- Simon Chilvers as Howard
- Kim Bullard as Coyote
- Stig Wemyss as Ratso
- Mark Williams as Mangles
- Alastair Cummings as Rabbit
- Robin Miller as Wally
- Matt Parkinson as Lurch
- Lorraine Webster as Mud
- Johnny Ryan as McBride
- Lance Karapetcoff as King
- Ric Whittle as Ross
- Penny Brown as Kate
- Alistair Browning as Cram
- Andy Copeman as Hayes

== Production ==
The movie was the first film directed by experienced cinematographer Vince Monton. Monton later said he felt the film was too adult (it received an M rating) when it should have been aimed at 13-year-olds.

In an interview, Kidman stated was attracted to the role of Jade because the character was older.

It’s inevitable that I’ll grow up. People do still remember me as being 15, but it’s slowly changing. It’s hard for a casting director to know where I fit in – I can play 22, 23, 24, if not physically then mentally.

— Nicole Kidman

Filming started 16 September 1985.

== Home media ==
Windrider was released on DVD by Umbrella Entertainment in March 2010. The DVD includes special features such as the theatrical trailer, Umbrella Entertainment trailers, a stills gallery, wind surfing promo, Young Thing music promo, Nicole Kidman music promo, an extended bedroom scene, script, press kit, press clippings, and cast biographies.

== See also ==
- Cinema of Australia
