= Ranger (ship) =

A number of vessels have been named Ranger:

- Ranger (1780 ship) was launched in 1776 in France, possibly as an East Indiaman for the French East India Company, and almost certainly under another name. From 1780 to 1786 she was a British vessel that was a transport and traded generally. In 1786–1787 she made one voyage for the British East India Company (EIC). From 1788 she traded between London and Ostend, and was last listed in 1793 with unchanged data. In 1788 she had sailed to the East Indies, perhaps with new owners from Ostend, and may have remained in the East Indies.
- Ranger (1786 ship) was launched in 1774 in Virginia, possibly under another name. Between at least 1781 and 1786 she was the London transport Thames. Then from 1786 until 1794, she became the Hull-based whaler Ranger. She was wrecked in 1797.
- Ranger (1789 ship) was launched in Liverpool in 1789. She made four complete voyages as a slave ship in the triangular trade in enslaved people. A French privateer captured her in 1796 during her fifth slave voyage, but she was recaptured some months later. Thereafter she disappears from online records.
- Ranger (1791 ship) was launched in 1791 in New Providence and immediately came to Britain. She generally traded between Liverpool and New Providence. She underwent grounding in 1795 and in 1796 her owners had her repaired, lengthened, and converted from a brig to a ship. A French privateer captured her in August 1797 after a single-ship action. In a process that is currently obscure, Ranger returned to British ownership circa 1799. She then became a West Indiaman. From 1803 on she became a Liverpool-based slave ship in the triangular trade in enslaved people. She made one complete slave trading voyage. Then French privateers captured her after she had embarked slaves in West Africa but before she could deliver them to the West Indies. A United States citizen purchased her at Guadeloupe and renamed her Delaware. In 1805 the Royal Navy recaptured her. She was returned to her British owners who sailed her between Ireland and Newfoundland. She was last listed in 1814.
- Ranger (1796 ship) was built in the Netherlands, reportedly for the Dutch East India Company, and almost certainly under another name. She was take in prize in 1796. She made one voyage as an East Indiaman for the British East India Company (EIC). She then traded to the West Indies and the Mediterranean before becoming a transport. French frigates captured her in 1810. The Royal Navy recaptured her almost immediately and used her to transport prisoners from Isle de France (Mauritius) to France. She then disappears from online records.
- Ranger (1796 London ship) was built in London in 1796. Between 1796 and 1801 she made three complete voyages as a slave ship in the triangular trade in enslaved people. New owners in 1801 had her lengthened and sailed her as a West Indiaman. She was lost in 1802.
- Ranger (1940) was an ocean-going tugboat commandeered by the United States Navy during the Second World War.

== See also ==
- HMS Ranger – any one of 15 vessels of the Royal Navy, or several hired armed vessels
- USS Ranger – any one of 10 vessels, actual or planned, of the United States Navy

or
