= The Legend of Kootenai Brown =

1991 film

- Directed by: Allan Kroeker
- Written by: John MacLachlan Gray
- Produced by: Gary Payne; Harold Lee Tichenor
- Starring: Tom Burlinson; Donnelly Rhodes; Michelle Thrush; Raymond Burr
- Cinematography: Ron Orieux
- Edited by: Lara Mazur
- Music by: Michael Conway Baker
- Production company: Crescent Entertainment
- Release date: August 1991 (MWFF)
- Running time: 96 minutes
- Country: Canada
- Language: English

The Legend of Kootenai Brown, retitled Showdown at Williams Creek in the United States, is a Canadian Western drama film, directed by Allan Kroeker and released in 1991. The film stars Tom Burlinson as Kootenay Brown, a mining prospector who was active in the 1860s in British Columbia and Montana, but ended up on trial for murder after killing a man in a duel. The cast also includes Donnelly Rhodes as conman McTooth; Michelle Thrush as Olivia D'Lonais, Brown's Métis love interest; and Raymond Burr as the judge at Brown's murder trial.

The film was shot primarily in Barkerville, British Columbia and the Waterton Lakes region of Alberta.

The film received two Genie Award nominations at the 12th Genie Awards in 1991, for Best Overall Sound (Larry Sutton, Bill Sheppard, Paul A. Sharpe) and Best Sound Editing (Gael MacLean, Alison Grace, Mike Keeping, Ingrid Rosen, Anke Bakker).
