= Winnipeg Rangers =

Winnipeg Rangers may refer to:

- Winnipeg Rangers (1939–1957)
- Winnipeg Rangers (1956–1967)
