= Tom Burlinson =

Canadian-Australian actor and singer

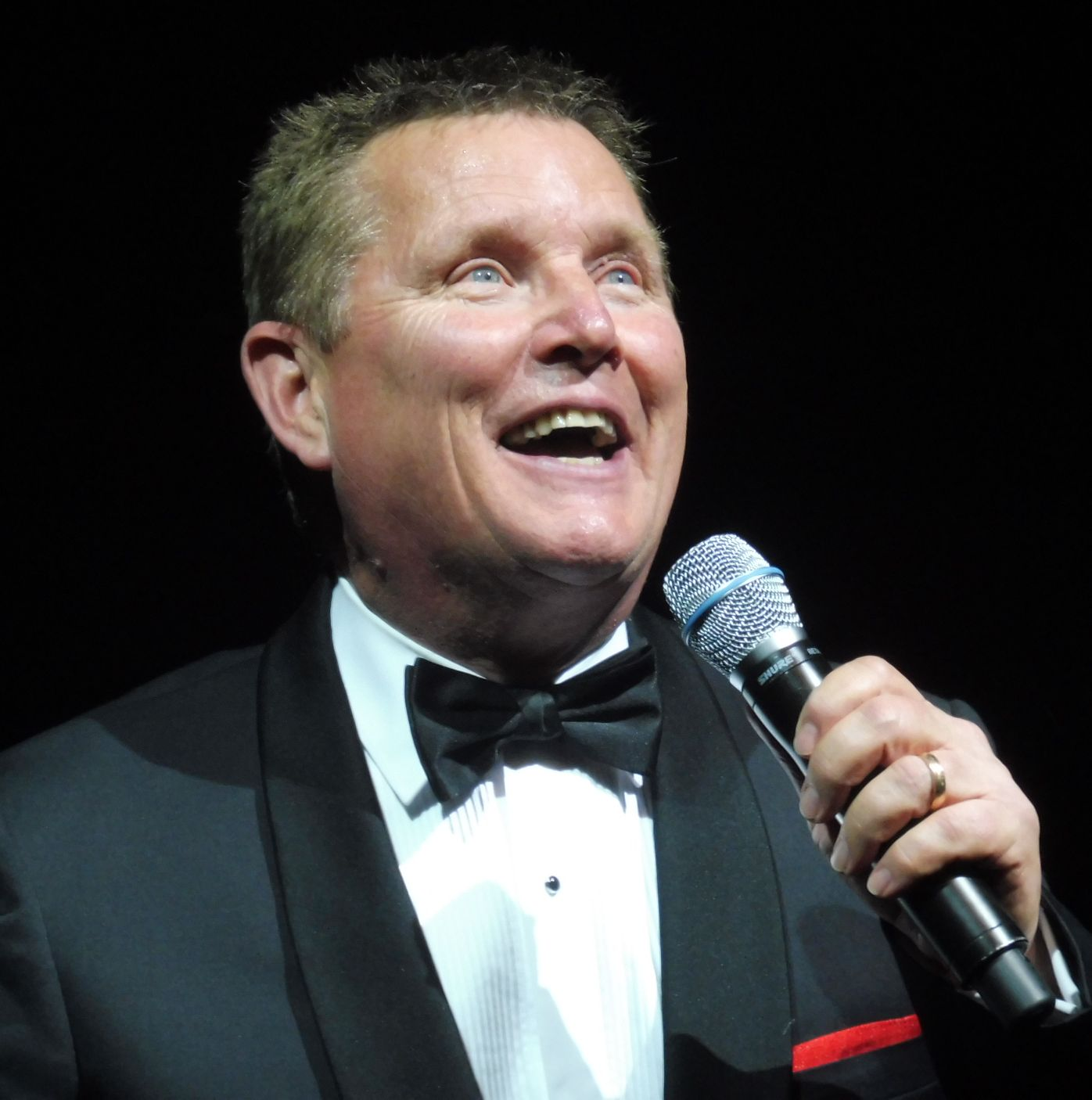
- Born: 14 February 1956 (age 70); Toronto, Ontario, Canada
- Education: National Institute of Dramatic Art (BFA)
- Occupation: Actor
- Years active: 1977–present
- Spouse: Mandy Carnie (m. 1996)
- Children: 3
- Website: Official website

Tom Burlinson (born 14 February 1956) is a Canadian-born Australian actor and singer.

== Early life ==
Tom Burlinson was born in Toronto, Canada, the son of Antony T. Burlinson (born 1923, in Greenwich, Middlesex) and Angela Schofield (born 1926, in Bury St Edmunds, Suffolk), who had migrated to Canada after World War II. The family moved to New Jersey, United States, in 1958. In 1962 the family returned to Britain because of Antony's job. In 1965, the family moved again, this time to Australia. After six months his parents divorced and his mother and two younger sisters returned to Britain, leaving Burlinson with his father and his older sister, Susan.

Burlinson's first public appearance as an actor was as Colonel Pickering in Mosman Primary School's production of My Fair Lady. Moving to Bayview, he attended Pittwater High School on Sydney's Northern Beaches and was the school captain in his final year.

Burlinson's father wanted him to become a lawyer, but because a friend was accepted into the National Institute of Dramatic Art (NIDA), he decided to audition and to his surprise he was accepted into the 1974 class, graduating in 1976.

== Career ==
After working for the Queensland Theatre Company and Twelfth Night Theatre in Brisbane in 1977, he started appearing on Australian TV. By the beginning of 1979, he began playing Mickey Pratt in the teen-oriented Australian soap opera The Restless Years, a role which lasted 16 months. In 1978, he appeared as Charlie in the Old Tote Theatre Company production of Da and as Jud Templeton in the play Tribute in 1979. In 1980, he played Hughie in the Anzac Day play The One Day of the Year. He also featured in the TV police drama Cop Shop in 1980–81 and in Skyways.

In 1981, Burlinson had his career break when he was given the main role in the biggest Australian film production ever, which was to be shot the next year, The Man from Snowy River, as the title character, Jim Craig. He had only a few short weeks to learn how to ride a horse and discovered he had somewhat of a natural ability and affinity with horses. Snowy River was filmed and released in Australia in 1982, quickly becoming the highest-grossing Australian film ever at that time, bringing Burlinson to stardom.

In his next film, Burlinson portrayed horse trainer Tommy Woodcock in Phar Lap: Heart of a Nation. This film was another hit and confirmed Burlinson as a major star in the Australian film industry.

In 1985, Burlinson was cast by Dutch director Paul Verhoeven for a role in the latter's first English-speaking film, the cult film Flesh and Blood.

In 1986, Burlinson played the main role as yuppy windsurfer in the modern day comedy romance Windrider alongside teen actress Nicole Kidman in her first adult role. The film was a modest hit in Australia.

In 1987, Burlinson was given his first role in a science fiction movie, The Time Guardian, in which he played the main role, Ballard, a visitor from another world, opposite Nikki Coghill and Hollywood stars Dean Stockwell and Carrie Fisher. In 1988 he starred in the long-waited Snowy River sequel, The Man from Snowy River II, called Return to Snowy River in the US and The Untamed in the UK.

From then onwards, Burlinson focused on historical productions, including the highly acclaimed 1988 LWT mini-series Piece of Cake, set in England in 1939 and based on the 1983 novel of the same name by Derek Robinson and the Canadian Western drama film The Legend of Kootenai Brown retitled Showdown at Williams Creek in the United States, set in pioneer North America.

He also does stage work, musicals and concerts as well as assisting charities.

Apart from his acting career, he is also a singer. A life-long love of the music of Frank Sinatra led Burlinson to compose an ode to the singer. He appeared on TV in 1990 on Ray Martin's Midday Show to nervously debut his singing voice to the Australian public with the song he had written, "The Man in the Hat".

The following year Tina Sinatra cast Burlinson as the voice of the young Sinatra in a miniseries she produced on her father's life, the Golden Globe Award-winning Sinatra. With new doors now open to him, Burlinson auditioned for several musicals.

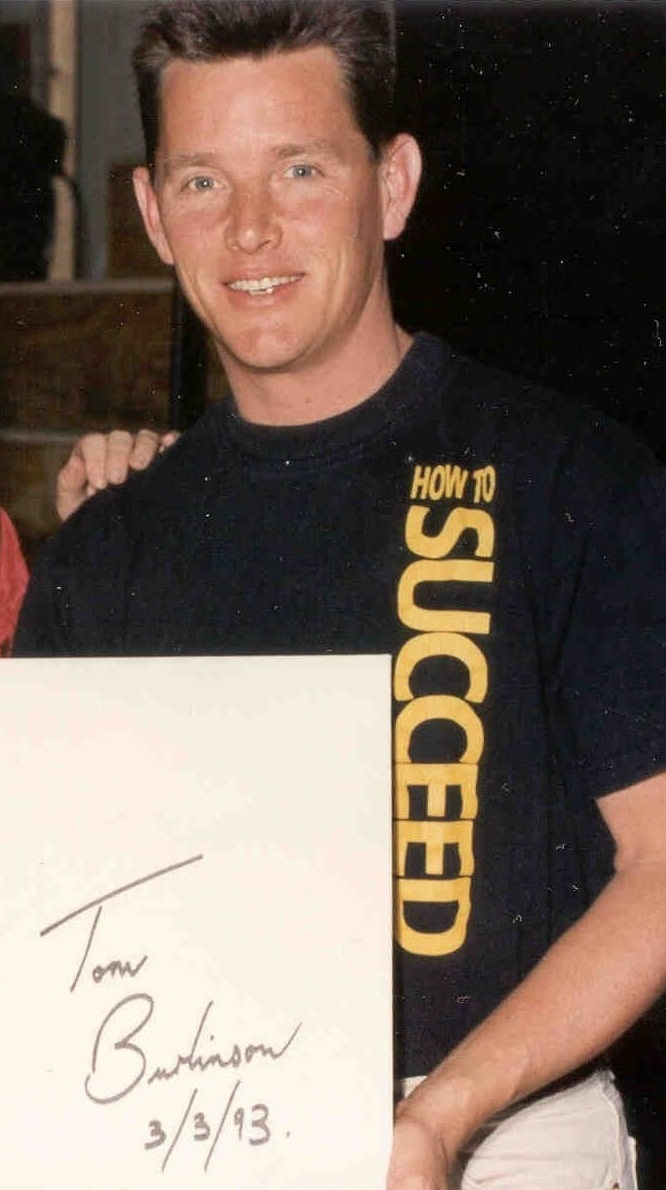
Burlinson, 1993

Burlinson returned to the stage in How To Succeed in Business Without Really Trying in 1992. He starred with some of Australia's most notable stage performers, Noel Ferrier, June Bronhill and Jackie Love. In 1996 he had stage roles with the Sydney Theatre Company, starring as Franklin in Merrily We Roll Along and as Ricky in Miracle City.

In 1998, Burlinson created Frank – The Sinatra Story in Song which opened at the Seymour Centre in Sydney before going to other major cities. Sinatra himself died just two weeks before the opening night. From 1998 to 2003 Burlinson toured Australia regularly and also took the show to corporate events. In 2001 the show's name was changed to Frank – A Life in Song. In 2002 he took the show to his native Toronto, Canada.

Burlinson's versatility has also been featured in appearances on TV's Carols by Candlelight in 1999 and 2002. He had also had a role on the ABC doctor drama G.P. and hosted a season of the Nine Network TV show Animal Hospital.

Burlinson provided Sinatra's singing voice in the 2003 Australian movie The Night We Called It a Day.

Burlinson returned to the world of theatre in April 2004 in the lead role of Leo Bloom in Mel Brooks' musical The Producers. He co-starred with Reg Livermore, Bert Newton and Chloe Dallimore.

For three years Burlinson was a judge on Australia's Got Talent alongside Red Symons and Dannii Minogue.

In 2010, he played a featured role in the movie The Cup, directed by Simon Wincer, who had directed Phar Lap.

Burlinson has continued to produce and star in his own musical shows celebrating the music of Frank Sinatra and other vocal stars including Now We're Swinging! which toured around Australia. He also co-starred in the concert performances of "Young at Heart" (2017) and "Swing That Music" (2018) at major venues around Australia.

In 2019, Burlinson played the role of lawyer Billy Flynn in the stage musical 'Chicago' in Sydney and Brisbane.

== Filmography ==
=== Film ===
| Year | Title | Role | Type |
|---|---|---|---|
| 1981 | Revenge | | Short film |
| 1982 | The Man from Snowy River | Jim Craig | Feature film |
| 1983 | Phar Lap: Heart of a Nation | Tommy Woodcock | Feature film |
| 1985 | Flesh and Blood | Steven | Feature film |
| 1985 | 20,000 Leagues Under the Sea | Ned Land (voice) | Animated TV movie |
| 1986 | Windrider | Stewart 'P.C.' Simpson | Feature film |
| 1986 | The Hunchback of Notre-Dame | Quasimodo (voice) | Animated TV movie |
| 1986 | King Solomon's Mines | Sir Henry Curtis (voice) | Animated TV movie |
| 1986 | Kidnapped | Alan Breck (voice) | Animated TV movie |
| 1987 | The Time Guardian | Ballard | Feature film |
| 1988 | The Man from Snowy River II | Jim Craig | Feature film |
| 1991 | The Legend of Kootenai Brown | Kootenai Brown | Feature film |
| 1992 | Landslide | Howard Matterson | Feature film |
| 1995 | The Way to Dusty Death | Ike Jethou | TV movie |
| 2003 | The Night We Called It a Day | Frank Sinatra (singing voice) | Feature film |
| 2011 | The Cup | Dave Phillips | Feature film |

=== Television ===
| Year | Title | Role | Type |
|---|---|---|---|
| 1977 | Kirby's Company | | TV series |
| 1978 | Cop Shop | Ken | TV series, 1 episode |
| 1978–1979 | The Restless Years | Mickey Pratt | TV series, 56 episodes |
| 1978 | Glenview High | Robbie's Dream Man | TV series, episode: "After the Loving" |
| 1978 | Yes, What? | | |
| 1979 | Skyways | Jim Backwell | TV series, episode: "Deborah Loves Jim" |
| 1985 | Fragments of Terror | John | Segment: "Revenge" |
| 1988 | Piece of Cake | 'Fanny' Barton | TV miniseries, 5 episodes |
| 1992 | Sinatra | Frank Sinatra (singing voice) | TV miniseries, 2 episodes |
| 1995 | The Way to Dusty Death | Ike Jethou | TV miniseries |
| 1995 | G.P. | Andy Drake | TV series, episode: "Rhythm & Blues" |
| 1997 | Animal Hospital | Host | TV series |
| 2007–09 | Australia’s Got Talent | Judge | TV series |

=== Games ===
| Year | Title | Role | Type |
|---|---|---|---|
| 2000 | Oz: The Magical Adventure | Scarecrow / Oz | PC game |

== Stage ==
=== As actor ===
| Year | Title | Role | Type |
|---|---|---|---|
| 1975 | Three Sisters | Prozorov | NIDA Theatre |
| 1976 | A Midsummer Night's Dream | | Newcastle, NIDA Theatre |
| 1977 | For Years I Couldn't Wear My Black | Reginald | SGIO Theatre |
| 1977 | Tom Sawyer | Tom Sawyer | Twelfth Night Theatre |
| 1977 | Dangerous Corner | Gordon Whitehouse | Twelfth Night Theatre |
| 1977 | The Merchant of Venice | Solanio | SGIO Theatre |
| 1978 | Da | Charlie (then) | UNSW Parade Theatre with Old Tote Theatre Company |
| 1979 | Tribute | Jud Templeton | Theatre Royal, Sydney, Newcastle Civic Theatre, Her Majesty's Theatre, Brisbane |
| 1980 | Duck Variations | Ermil Varec | Stables Theatre |
| 1980 | The One Day of the Year | Hughie Cook | Playhouse, Adelaide |
| 1980 | Winter in America | | Stables Theatre |
| 1993 | How to Succeed in Business Without Really Trying | J. Pierrepont Finch | University of Sydney, Lyric Theatre Sydney, His Majesty's Theatre, Perth |
| 1994 | The Bard on Broadway | | The Regent Hotel, Kingsford |
| 1996 | Miracle City | Pastor Ricky Truswell | Wharf Theatre with STC |
| 1996 | Merrily We Roll Along | Franklin | University of Sydney with STC |
| 1998 | Frank: The Sinatra Story in Song | Singer / Narrator | Seymour Centre, Comedy Theatre, Melbourne, Festival Theatre, Adelaide, Capitol Theatre, Sydney, Lyric Theatre, Brisbane, Star City Sydney |
| 1999, 2002 | Carols by Candlelight | Singer | Sidney Myer Music Bowl |
| 2003 | The Spirit of Christmas | Singer | Concert Hall, Brisbane |
| 2004-05 | The Producers | Leopold Bloom | Princess Theatre, Melbourne, Lyric Theatre, Brisbane, Lyric Theatre, Sydney |
| 2008 | Frank - A Life in Song | Singer / Narrator | Sydney Opera House |
| 2011 | Swing Time | Singer | Palm Beach Golf Club |
| 2013 | Now We're Swingin' | Singer | Dunstan Playhouse |
| 2013 | Frank - A Life in Song | Singer / Narrator | Lismore City Hall |
| 2016 | Sinatra at the Sands | Singer | Festival Theatre, Adelaide |
| 2016 | The Last Galah | Singer | Festival Theatre, Adelaide |
| 2017 | Young at Heart | Singer | Sydney Opera House |
| 2019 | Chicago | Billy Flynn | Capitol Theatre Sydney, Lyric Theatre, Brisbane |
| 2019 | Great American Songbook | Singer | The Star Gold Coast |
| 2020 | Swingin' the Great Standards | Singer | Dunstan Playhouse |

=== As crew ===
| Year | Title | Role | Type |
|---|---|---|---|
| 1998 | Frank: The Sinatra Story in Song | Devisor / producer | Seymour Centre, Comedy Theatre, Melbourne, Festival Theatre, Adelaide, Capitol Theatre, Sydney, Lyric Theatre, Brisbane, Star City Sydney |
