= Rose Ranger =

Canadian singer-songwriter

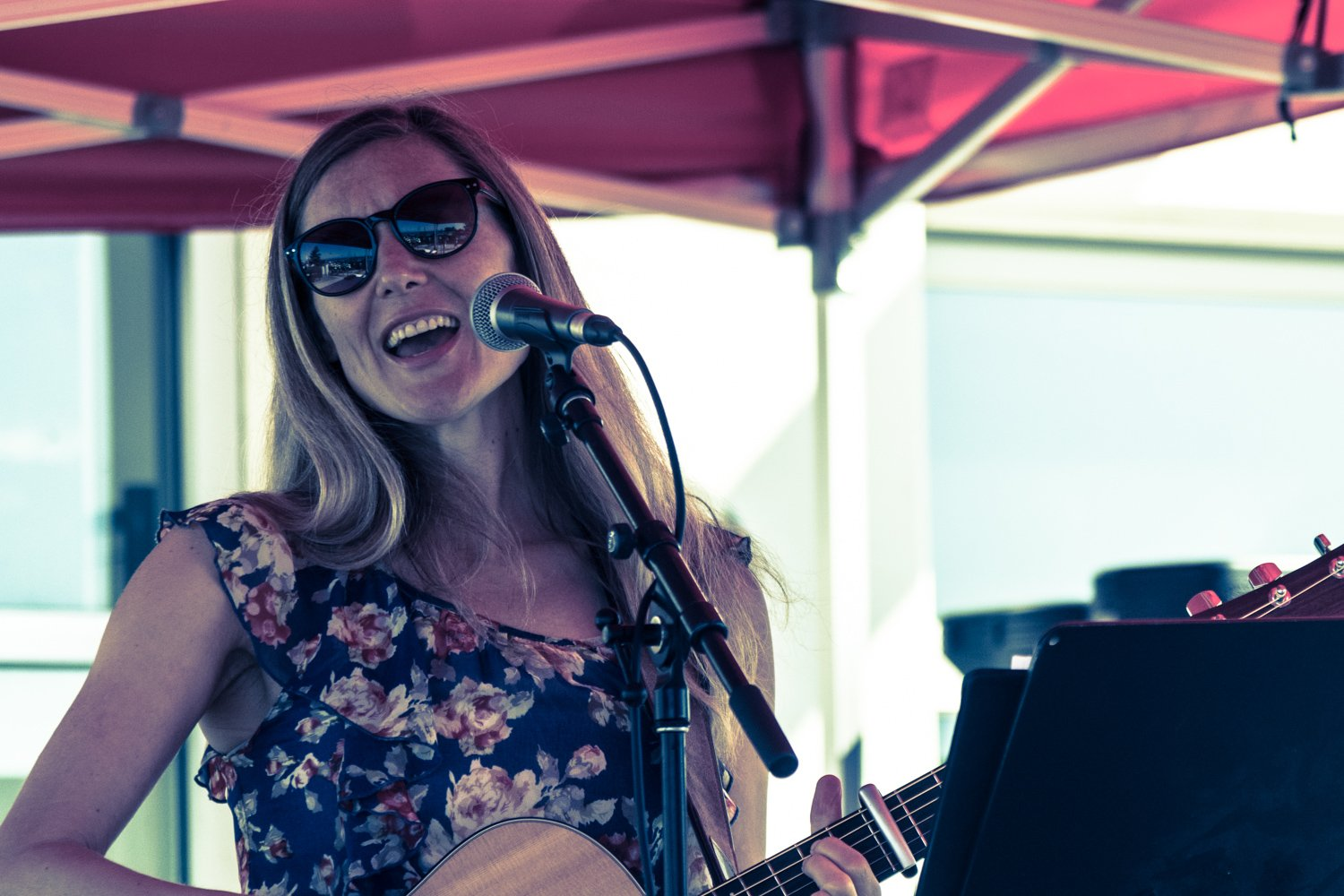
- Ranger performing at the Dragon Boat BC Festival

Background information
- Born: North Vancouver, British Columbia, Canada
- Genres: Pop, electro, adult contemporary, folk rock
- Occupations: Musician, singer, songwriter, music producer, actress
- Instruments: Vocals, guitar, keyboards
- Years active: 2000–present
- Labels: Coast Music, Warner Music Canada, BMG Chrysalis
- Website: Website

Rose Ranger (born in North Vancouver, British Columbia, Canada) is a Canadian singer, songwriter, music producer and actress. Now with six albums, Ranger performs both solo and with her band. She has written and recorded with some of Canada's top musicians, toured the world, opened for Keith Urban, and her original songs have been featured in The Young and the Restless, Beautiful People, Strong Medicine, Undressed, Joan of Arcadia, Dawson's Creek, Party of Five, Hallmark's The Story of Us, GAC's Destined at Christmas, Lifetime's Christmas Angel, Whistler Film Festival, CBC Docs, and feature films including, The Bandit Hound and Deluxe Combo Platter.

== Discography ==
=== Studio albums ===
Title	Details
Replies	Released: 1 May 2002; Label: Pacific/Warner Music; Format: Compact disc Digital download
Bloom	Released: 1 September 2006; Label: Coast Music/Independent; Format: Compact disc Digital download
Winter Town	Released: 1 November 2009; Label: Coast Music/BMG Chrysalis; Format: Compact disc Digital download
Fall into You	Released: 27 September 2011; Label: Pacific/Warner Music; Format: Compact disc Digital download
Roses	Released: 6 January 2015; Label: Pacific/Warner Music; Format: Compact disc Digital download
Confessions	Released: 17 June 2022; Label: Coast Music; Format: Compact disc Digital download

=== Singles ===
Heaven Must Be There
Watching Me
Fly
Nobody's Fool
Soul Sisters
Fall into You
I'm With You
Beautifully Broken
Beautifully Broken (Featuring Kyprios)
Beautifully Broken (Acoustic Mix)
Beautiful Baby
Air
Gravity
Confession
Power
Love
Warrior
Dear Dad

== Filmography ==
=== Television ===
Year	Title	Role	Notes
2018	Sacred Lies	Prophet Wife	Recurring role
2019	Supernatural	Caitlin	Episode: "Lebanon"
2019	Arrow	Senior Officer	Episode: "Training Day"
2025	The Hunting Party	Jessup Mother	Episode: "Clayton Jessup"
