= 172nd Battalion (Rocky Mountain Rangers), CEF =

Expeditionary Force

The 172nd (Rocky Mountain Rangers) Battalion, CEF was a unit in the Canadian Expeditionary Force during the First World War. Based in Kamloops, British Columbia, the unit began recruiting during the winter of 1915/16 in Kamloops and district. After sailing to England in October 1916, the battalion was absorbed into the 24th Reserve Battalion on January 1, 1917. The 172nd (Rocky Mountain Rangers) Battalion, CEF had one Officer Commanding: Lieut-Col. J. R. Vicars.

The battalion is perpetuated by the Rocky Mountain Rangers.

== Motto ==
The motto of the Rocky Mountain Rangers was in the Chinook Jargon, a trade language that was popular with settler populations in early British Columbia. Meaning "stand guard", or "watch well", it was Kloshe Nanitch.
