= Power Rangers (disambiguation) =

Power Rangers is an entertainment and merchandising franchise.

Power Rangers may also refer to:

- Power Rangers or Mighty Morphin Power Rangers (1993–1995 TV series)
  - "Power Rangers" (song) (1994)
  - Mighty Morphin Power Rangers: The Movie (1995)
  - Power Rangers (film), a 2017 feature film reboot of the series
- Power Rangers (comics)
  - Power Rangers (Boom! Studios) (2016–present)
- The South Korean name for Super Sentai
- Power/Rangers, a 2015 fan film based on the franchise
