= Rocky Mountain Rangers =

Coordinates: 50°40′11″N 120°22′23″W

- Regimental badge
- Active: 1908–present
- Country: Canada
- Branch: Canadian Army
- Type: Light infantry
- Role: To close with and destroy the enemy
- Size: One battalion
- Part of: 39 Canadian Brigade Group
- Garrison/HQ: JR Vicars Armoury, 1221 McGill Road, Kamloops, British Columbia
- Nickname: "Rangers"
- Motto: Kloshe nanitch (Chinook jargon for 'Keep a good lookout')
- March: "The Meeting of the Waters"
- Engagements: First World War; Second World War; War in Afghanistan
- Battle honours: See #Battle honours
- Website: canada.ca/en/army/corporate/3-canadian-division/the-rocky-mountain-rangers.html

Commanders
- Commanding officer: LCol Torry White, CD
- Regimental sergeant-major: CWO David Moon, CD

Insignia
- NATO Map Symbol (2017)
- Abbreviation: RM Rang

The Rocky Mountain Rangers is a Primary Reserve infantry regiment of the Canadian Army, one of only four infantry regiments in British Columbia, and the only infantry unit that recruits in Northern BC and much of the Interior. The regimental headquarters are at JR Vicars Armoury in Kamloops, with an additional rifle company in Prince George. The Rocky Mountain Rangers are part of the 3rd Canadian Division's 39 Canadian Brigade Group, the brigade responsible for Canadian Army organization in British Columbia.

== Lineage ==
Regimental colour

Camp flag

=== The Rocky Mountain Rangers ===
- Originated 1 April 1908 in Nelson, British Columbia, as the 102nd Regiment
- Redesignated 1 June 1909 as the 102nd Regiment, Rocky Mountain Rangers
- Redesignated 12 March 1920 as The Rocky Mountain Rangers
- Redesignated 1 January 1941 as the 2nd (Reserve) Battalion, The Rocky Mountain Rangers
- Redesignated 28 January 1946 as The Rocky Mountain Rangers

There is no lineal connection to the Rocky Mountain Rangers of the North-West Rebellion of 1885.

== Perpetuations ==
=== Great War ===
- 172nd Battalion (Rocky Mountain Rangers), CEF

== Operational history ==
=== Great War ===
The 102nd Regiment, Rocky Mountain Rangers, was called-out on active service on 6 August 1914 for local protection duties.

The 172nd Battalion (Rocky Mountain Rangers), CEF, was authorized on 15 July 1916 and embarked for Great Britain on 25 October 1916. There, its personnel were absorbed by the 24th Reserve Battalion, CEF on 1 January 1917 to provide reinforcements for the Canadian Corps in the field. The battalion disbanded on 17 July 1917.

After the militia reorganization of 1936, and in the years prior to the Second World War, the regiment had four companies: A Company in Kamloops, B Company in Salmon Arm, C Company in Armstrong, and D Company in Revelstoke.

=== Second World War ===
The regiment was called out on service on 26 August 1939. Details of the regiment were subsequently placed on active service on 1 September 1939, as The Rocky Mountain Rangers, CASF (Details), for local protection duties. The details called out on active service were disbanded on 31 December 1940.

The regiment subsequently mobilized the 1st Battalion, The Rocky Mountain Rangers, CASF for active service on 1 January 1941. It served in Canada in a home defence role as part of the 18th Infantry Brigade, 6th Canadian Division and took part in the expedition to Kiska, Alaska as part of the 13th Canadian Infantry Brigade Group, serving there from 16 August 1943 to 12 January 1944.

It embarked for Great Britain on 25 May 1944. It was redesignated as the 1st Canadian Infantry Training Battalion, Type A (Rocky Mountain Rangers), CASF on 1 November 1944. Following VE Day it was redesignated as the No. 9 Canadian Repatriation Depot, Type "T" on 5 July 1945. The overseas battalion disbanded on 28 January 1946.

=== Afghanistan ===
The regiment was not called out on active service; however, some individual members volunteered. In the aggregate, more than 20% of the regiment’s authorized strength served with various task forces in Afghanistan between 2002 and 2014.

== History ==
=== Early history ===
On 1 July 1898, five independent rifle companies were formed in the interior of British Columbia at Kamloops, Nelson, Kaslo, Rossland, and Revelstoke. These units were named by their location (Kamloops Rifle Company etc.) The independent companies were renamed the Rocky Mountain Rangers in 1900 but remained independent companies. No regimental headquarters was established at this time. The same year saw nineteen men from the unit depart to fight in the Second Boer War.

On 1 April 1908, an additional company was formed in Nelson, this unit with the three southern companies were amalgamated to form the 102nd Regiment with headquarters in Nelson. An independent company was formed in Armstrong. The Rocky Mountain Rangers were reduced to two companies in Kamloops and Revelstoke. In 1909 these two remaining companies were amalgamated with the others to form the 102nd Regiment Rocky Mountain Rangers. In 1912 a reorganization of the regiment saw the companies in Rossland, Nelson, Kaslo and Revelstoke disbanded, the headquarters relocated to Kamloops and the Armstrong company amalgamated. Later that year, the Revelstoke company was reinstated and more companies added at Kelowna, Salmon Arm, Vernon and Penticton.

=== First World War ===
With the advent of the First World War, the 102nd Regiment Rocky Mountain Rangers was placed on active service for local protection duties. In 1916 the unit raised the 172nd Battalion Canadian Expeditionary Force for overseas deployment. On arrival overseas the battalion was dispersed to augment other Canadian infantry units. Although the men did not fight as Rocky Mountain Rangers, the regiment was awarded battle honours by virtue of their contribution in the battles of Arras, 1917, Hill 70, Ypres 1917, Amiens, Hindenburg Line and Valenciennes. Princess Patricia of Connaught presented a set of unofficial colours to the 172nd battalion in 1916. The battle honours were emblazoned on the colours after the war.

The 102nd Regiment continued to serve in a reserve capacity for much of the war. One of its tasking was to staff internment camps at Revelstoke, Mara Lake and Vernon. The 102nd also provided substantial numbers to the 54th (Kootenay) Battalion of the CEF. In 1917 the 172nd Battalion was reduced to nil and disbanded to be perpetuated by The Rocky Mountain Rangers. In 1920 the regiment renamed The Rocky Mountain Rangers and reorganized to four companies. The unit organization remained basically the same until the start of the Second World War.

=== Second World War ===
In August 1939 the regiment was called out for local defence duties, to guard vulnerable points along the CPR/CNR railways. This task was taken over by the Royal Canadian Mounted Police by early 1940 as the regiment was down to almost nil strength due to reinforcement drafts to other active units.

In June 1940 the regiment, re-designated The Rocky Mountain Rangers CASF, was ordered to mobilise to full wartime strength. The active service 1st Battalion was employed on west-coast defence duties in various communities in the Vancouver area, Prince Rupert and on Vancouver Island. During one notable deployment, the battalion marched from Kamloops to Vancouver as a training exercise under simulated war conditions. The 500 km march took 14 days with temperatures reaching 40 °C. This march was re-enacted by the unit's serving members in 1998.

The situation developing in the Pacific presented a real and immediate threat to the Pacific coast and the BC interior. To meet this threat the reserve unit, now re-designated the 2nd Battalion, was assigned to the 39 (Reserve) Brigade Group and tasked to provide protection of vulnerable industrial points along the CPR railway lines in the interior and to recruit and train as part of a brigade group in defence of the west coast. With its headquarters remaining in Kamloops, the battalion was spread along the main and southern CPR rail lines from Ashcroft in the west to Fernie in the east.

==== Kiska ====
In 1943 the 1st Battalion, then part of the 13th Canadian Infantry Brigade, sailed from Vancouver Island to the US base on the island of Adak in the Aleutian Island chain, where the battalion underwent specialized training for the assault on the Japanese-occupied island of Kiska. The Rocky Mountain Rangers formed the core of the 16th Canadian Combat Team for the assault on Kiska. The force sailed from Adak on 13 August for a scheduled assault on Kiska two days later. As it was, the Japanese had abandoned the island several days before under the cover of fog and darkness, leaving a cannon which was later brought back to Vernon Military Camp. The Rangers remained on the island until the middle of January 1944, losing an officer and several men to booby traps and friendly fire. This operation is commemorated every year with the unit's Christmas dinner being designated as Kiska dinner.

==== 1944–1945 ====
Later that year the 1st Battalion sailed to Europe as part of the 13th Infantry Brigade. Upon arrival in England the Rangers were welcomed and hosted by the British infantry regiment The Green Howards (Alexandra, Princess of Wales Own Yorkshire Regiment), the beginning of a close relationship which continues today. The two regiments were officially designated allied regiments in 1948. As in the First World War the 1st Battalion was broken up to augment other under strength Canadian units. Once again over 5000 Rocky Mountain Rangers fought overseas with other Canadian units.

=== Post-war ===
In 1946 the unit was reverted to reserve status with HQ in Kamloops and companies in Kamloops, Prince George, Salmon Arm, Armstrong and Revelstoke. In 1952 the company in Revelstoke was relocated to Whitehorse. This company became inactive three years later. In 1959 the Armstrong company headquarters was relocated to Revelstoke. This organization remained until 1970 when the companies in Prince George and Salmon Arm were reduced to nil strength. In 1978 the company in Revelstoke was relocated to Salmon Arm. In 1998 the company in Salmon Arm was reduced to nil strength and relocated on paper to Kamloops.

The original regimental colours presented to the regiment by Princess Patricia in 1916, though never consecrated, now hang in St Paul's Cathedral in Kamloops. In 1983 Prince Philip, Duke of Edinburgh, presented the first official consecrated colours to the regiment in a ceremony at Kamloops. A replacement stand of regimental colours was presented in 1998 following the official reversion to green facings used by the rifle regiments in place of the blue facing used by line infantry regiments.

The Freedom of the City of Kamloops was presented to the regiment in 1982, Salmon Arm in 1992, and Prince George in 2018.

=== Recent activities ===
In 2008 the unit saw the deployment of 12 of its soldiers to Afghanistan, and has since deployed troops in further support of the Canadian effort in Afghanistan. 2008 also marked the unit's 100th anniversary, making it one of the first reserve units in British Columbia to do so. In addition to Afghanistan-related deployments, Rocky Mountain Rangers also provided support to the 2010 Winter Olympics.

In February 2011, 39 Canadian Brigade Group announced that the Rocky Mountain Rangers would be standing up a detachment of company strength in the community of Prince George, forty years after the unit there had been reduced to nil strength. The Rocky Mountain Rangers continue successful recruiting efforts in the community, having reached platoon size, "B" Company is approaching company size. 2016 saw an average of 60 soldiers parading out of Prince George, up from the expected 30 or so in 2013.

Since 2014, the Rocky Mountain Rangers have deployed members on Operation Reassurance, Operation Unifier, and Operation Impact. Members have served with different battalions of Princess Patricia's Canadian Light Infantry during these six-month deployments to Latvia, Ukraine, and shorter deployments to the United Kingdom.

When Canada was faced with the challenge of the COVID-19 pandemic, members of the regiment assisted the people of Canada by deploying on Operation Laser, the Canadian Forces' operation to assist in the vaccination rollout. The pandemic proved a challenging time for the regiment, and the Canadian Forces as a whole, as it had to make rapid changes concerning how it recruited and trained its members. Although challenging, the leadership and members of the regiment were able to endure and accomplish its main priority in assisting to protect the people of Canada.

During the same period, the Rangers regularly deploy members onto Operation Lentus, the Canadian Armed Forces' response to domestic emergencies in British Columbia. Members assisted the BC Wildfire Service in fighting the 2023 wildfire season, the worst on record.

=== Lineage chart ===
Lineage chart

1898	Rossland Rifle Coy
1900	No. 1 Coy, Rocky Mountain Rangers (Note: Independent rifle company)
1908
1909
1916	172nd "Overseas" Bn, CEF
1917	Absorbed by 24th Reserve Bn
1920
1936
1941	1st Bn, The Rocky Mountain Rangers, CASF
1944	1st Canadian Infy Training Bn, Type A (Rocky Mountain Rangers), CASF
1945	No. 9 Canadian Repatriation Depot, Type "T"
1946	Disbanded

Nelson Rifle Coy
No. 2 Coy, Rocky Mountain Rangers
102nd Regt
102nd Regt, Rocky Mountain Rangers
1st Bn (172nd Bn, CEF), The Rocky Mountain Rangers
The Rocky Mountain Rangers
2nd (Reserve) Bn, The Rocky Mountain Rangers
The Rocky Mountain Rangers

Kaslo Rifle Coy
No. 4 Coy, Rocky Mountain Rangers
2nd Bn, (Note: Reserve) The Rocky Mountain Rangers
Disbanded

Kamloops Rifle Coy
No. 3 Coy, Rocky Mountain Rangers
C Coy, Rocky Mountain Rangers

Revelstoke Rifle Coy
No. 5 Coy, Rocky Mountain Rangers
E Coy, Rocky Mountain Rangers

== Alliances ==
- United Kingdom - The Royal Yorkshire Regiment (14th/15th, 19th and 33rd/76th Foot)

== Battle honours ==
Regimental colour

In the list below, battle honours in capitals were awarded for participation in large operations and campaigns, while those in lowercase indicate honours granted for more specific battles. The Rocky Mountain Rangers' battle honours were earned by members fighting with other units. During the Great War, the regiment's CEF battalion was broken up and its members sent to other numbered battalions of the Canadian Corps. The numbered battalions included:

- The 47th Battalion (now perpetuated by the Royal Westminster Regiment)
- The 54th Battalion (now perpetuated by the 24th Field Artillery Regiment, RCA)
- The 72nd Battalion (now perpetuated by the Seaforth Highlanders of Canada)

The honours below were specifically granted to the Rocky Mountain Rangers due to the sacrifice and effort of the members who fought in other numbered battalions. Those battle honours followed by a "+" are emblazoned on the regimental colour.

=== Great War ===
- Arras+
  - 1917+
  - 1918+
- HILL 70+
- Ypres, 1917+
- Amiens+
- Hindenburg Line+
- Valenciennes+

=== War in Afghanistan ===
- Afghanistan

== Armoury ==
Site	Date(s)	Designated	Location	Description	Image
JR Vicars Armoury, 1221 Mcgill Rd 250-851-4896	1902 David Ewart		Kamloops, British Columbia	* Housing The Rocky Mountain Rangers, this Neo-Gothic style structure is centrally located	

== The Rocky Mountain Rangers Museum and Archives ==
Rocky Mountain Rangers Museum and Archives
- Location: JR Vicars Armoury, 1221 McGill Road, Kamloops, British Columbia
- Type: Regimental Museum
- Website: memorybc.ca/rocky-mountain-rangers-museum-and-archives

The museum collects and preserves artifacts, documents, records and material relating to the history of The Rocky Mountain Rangers in peace and war, and its history within the context of the military history of Canada, both for regimental personnel and the general public.

== Marches ==
The Rocky Mountain Rangers have maintained different marches in its history. At its creation and throughout the First World War, the march was "St. Patrick's Day", a popular tune favoured by Lieutenant Colonel Vicars due to his Irish heritage. In the modern day, the regiment marches to the bagpiper tune "The Meeting of the Waters", a march that is popular amongst the members of the regiment and is symbolic to the location of A Company in Kamloops, where the South Thompson River meets the North Thompson River. As with other regiments, soldiers of the Rocky Mountain Rangers come to the position of attention when they hear the piper's tune and maintain this until the songs completion.

== Cadet units ==
There are several Royal Canadian Army Cadets corps spread across British Columbia that are or have been affiliated to the Rocky Mountain Rangers. Cadets are not soldiers; they are part of an organization dedicated to developing citizenship and leadership among young men and women aged 12 to 18 years of age with a military flavour, and are not required to join the Canadian Forces.

Corps	Location	Formation date	Disbanded/Active
950 RCACC	Merritt	13 December 1921	Active
1787 RCACC	Salmon Arm	28 February 1941	Active
2276 RCACC	Fort St. John	3 September 1946	No longer affiliated
2305 RCACC	Kamloops	26 January 1948	Active
2458 RCACC	Revelstoke	1 October 1952	Active
2510 RCACC	Sicamous	1 January 1954	Disbanded 2015
2618 RCACC	Prince George	13 January 1958	Active
2887 RCACC	100 Mile House	1 September 1971	Active
2941 RCACC	Clearwater	15 October 2002	Disbanded
3063 RCACC	Enderby	31 March 2000	No longer affiliated
3064 RCACC	Williams Lake	1 September 2000	Active

Cadet units affiliated to the Rocky Mountain Rangers receive support and also are entitled to wear traditional regimental accoutrements on their uniforms.

== Media ==
- The Rocky Mountain Rangers, The First 100 Years, 1908-2008 by Vincent Bezeau (2008)
- The First World War’s 172nd Battalion Rocky Mountain Rangers (1916-1919) by Len Gamble (2021)

== See also ==
- Canadian Forces
- History of the Canadian Army
- Military history of Canada

== Order of precedence ==
Preceded by The Royal Regina Rifles	The Rocky Mountain Rangers	Succeeded by The Loyal Edmonton Regiment (4th Battalion, Princess Patricia's Canadian Light Infantry)
