= Ranger (1796 London ship) =

History

Great Britain
- Name: Ranger
- Launched: 1796, London
- Fate: Lost 1802

General characteristics
- Tons burthen: 1796: 98 (bm); 1801: 122 (bm)
- Armament: 1801: 10 × 3-pounder guns; 1802: 2 × 2-pounder + 2 × 6-pounder + 6 × 4-pounder guns

Ranger was built in London in 1796. Between 1796 and 1801 she made three complete voyages as a slave ship in the triangular trade in enslaved people. New owners in 1801 had her lengthened and sailed her as a West Indiaman. She was lost in 1802.

== Career ==
Ranger first appeared in Lloyd's Register (LR) in 1796.

Year	Master	Owner	Trade	Source & notes
1796	Anderson	Miles & Co.	London–Africa	LR

1st voyage transporting enslaved people (1796–1797): Captain Charles Anderson sailed from London on 2 October 1796, bound for the Windward Coast. In 1796, 103 vessels sailed from English ports, bound for the trade in enslaved people; eight of these vessels sailed from London.

Ranger acquired captives between Rio Nuñez and the Assini River. On her way from Africa she stopped at Prince's Island and arrived at Barbados on 30 June 1797 with 162 captives. She sailed from Barbados on 20 July and arrived back at London on 19 September.

2nd voyage transporting enslaved people (1797–1799): Captain Richard Vaughn sailed from London on 8 November 1797, bound for the Gold Coast. In 1797, 104 vessels sailed from English ports, bound for the trade in enslaved people; 12 of these vessels sailed from London.

Ranger arrived at Demerara on 15 January 1799 with 160 captives. She arrived back at London on 3 July 1799.

3rd voyage transporting enslaved people (1799–1801): Captain Vaughn sailed from London on 28 July 1799. In 1799, 156 vessels sailed from English ports, bound for the trade in enslaved people; 17 of these vessels sailed from London.

Ranger acquired captives at Cape Coast Castle. She stopped at Prince's Island before sailing on to Demerara, where she arrived on 18 August 1800 with 163 captives. On her way back to England, Ranger stopped at Cork. Vaughn and Ranger arrived back at London on 8 February 1801.

Year	Master	Owner	Trade	Source & notes
1801	Vaughn; R.Whitrang; W.Lee	Miles & Co. Hodson & Co.	London–Africa; London–New Providence	LR; lengthened 1801
1802	Whitrong; W.Lee	Hudson	London–Providence	LR; lengthened 1801

== Fate ==
In April 1802 Lloyd's List reported that Ranger, Lea, master, had been lost off New Providence. The Register of Shipping for 1802 carried the annotation "Lost" by her name.
