= Ranger Peak (California) =

Mountain in California, United States

- Location within California

Highest point
- Elevation: 5,085 ft (1,550 m) NAVD 88
- Prominence: 2 ft (0.61 m)
- Coordinates: 33°50′40″N 116°49′34″W

Geography
- Location: Riverside County, California, U.S.
- Parent range: San Jacinto Mountains
- Topo map: USGS Lake Fulmor

Ranger Peak is a mountain peak located in the San Bernardino National Forest of the San Jacinto Mountains in Riverside County, California.

== Geography ==
The mountain peak stands at 5,082 feet (1,550 m). It is located on the northwestern slope of the San Jacinto Mountains within San Bernardino National Forest. The summit offers views of San Bernardino Mountains, Yucaipa Ridge, and the Inland Valleys.

== History ==
In 1939, four San Bernardino fire lookout towers were added by the U.S. Forest Service. These emergency lookup stations were deployed to counter a heatwave and included stations on Ranger Peak, Thomas Mountain, Butler Peak, and Cajon Mountain.
