= Rocky Mountain Rangers (1885) =

- A Rocky Mountain Ranger patrol formed up near Medicine Hat. Heading up the column, on the extreme right, is Chief Scout "Kootenai" Brown, with Captain Lord Richard Boyle beside him.
- Active: 1885
- Disbanded: 1885
- Country: Canada
- Branch: Non-Permanent Active Militia
- Type: Cavalry
- Size: 114 officers and men
- Part of: Alberta Field Force
- Garrison/HQ: Fort Macleod
- Battle honours: North West Canada, 1885.

The Rocky Mountain Rangers were one of the volunteer militia units raised in Canada's North West in response to the 1885 North-West Rebellion. It was a body of mounted irregulars, mostly cowboys and ranchers from the area around Fort Macleod (District of Alberta), the headquarters of the North-West Mounted Police (NWMP) at the base of the foothills of the Rocky Mountains, about 150 miles (240 km) west of Medicine Hat (in what was then the District of Assiniboia). This unit is not to be confused with the present-day Canadian Army Reserve unit The Rocky Mountain Rangers of Kamloops, British Columbia. Rather, it is the ultimate ancestor of the South Alberta Light Horse (SALH).

== History ==
The campaign against Riel in North West Canada was put under the command of Major-General Frederick Middleton, a British-born commander of the Canadian Militia, who had seen extensive military service. Middleton did not trust the newly formed Canadian Militia cavalry troops from Eastern Canada, as they had little experience, and had no feel for the ground on which they were to patrol. Instead, Middleton took the advice given to him by the Prime Minister, Sir John A. Macdonald, who suggested that he recruit local troops, who would be "much more serviceable than town-bred men who compose our cavalry."

The main purpose of the RMR was to fight as a mounted cavalry against either discontented Canadian First Nations, or border-jumping American warriors. They were to supplement patrols of the NWMP and provide security to the railroad construction crews.

Major John Stewart, 1885

Commanded by John Stewart, a rancher turned militia officer from the Fort Macleod area, the RMR was a microcosm of local citizens, stockmen, trappers, politicians and discharged Mounties hammered into an irregular cavalry unit.

Stewart was directed in early March 1885 to organize "four units of Rocky Mountain Rangers". Stewart was in immediate communication by telegraph with former military contacts back home, as he was visiting family in Ottawa when news of the Metis uprising reached him. He quickly began the task of organizing the units.

There were 114 members led by Major Stewart. The members were to supply their own mounts, tack and sidearms but since this last resulted in a variety of questionable weapons, Major Stewart arranged for the issuance of some NWMP rifles including a few of the obsolete single-shot Snider–Enfield .577 and 40 of the new Winchester Model 1876 .45-75.

Edward N. Baker, RMR, 1885

Number 3 Troop of the RMR remained in the Fort Macleod area as a home guard, but Number 1 and 2 Troops were sent to Medicine Hat, a very strategic point where the newly built Canadian Pacific Railway bridged the South Saskatchewan River – the largest physical obstacle on its entire route between Winnipeg and the Rocky Mountains. Seizure or destruction of the bridge at that point would have played havoc with continued effective use of the railway, which was of immense help in transporting men, equipment and supplies.

The RMR's main task was to patrol the region of southern Alberta District and western Assiniboia District, in the Cypress Hills region. As events unfolded quite rapidly in the North-West Rebellion near Batoche and Duck Lake, Saskatchewan, a fair distance north of the Cypress Hills, it soon became apparent that the Rangers were not going to be directly involved in that fighting. Still, there were a couple of incidents in which the Rangers took action.

The first was on 19 May, when a cattle herder was attacked by First Nations and Métis warriors, and the second was in early June when a patrol near the Cypress Hills came under attack. So, while not directly involved in the main fighting in Saskatchewan, the Rangers were always aware that trouble could have developed farther south, and the presence of the Rangers helped keep the peace and provide assurance to the local settlers.

The 1885 RMR were disbanded on 17 July that year. There was probably much disappointment among the troops at the disbanding of the corps. However, Captain Stewart was able to obtain the North West Canada Medal and the Rebellion scrip. The scrip entitled any Ranger who applied for it either $80 or 320 acres (130 ha) of land.

== Perpetuation ==
As the ultimate ancestor of the SALH, the battle honour North West Canada, 1885, is borne on the guidon of the SALH due to the service of the RMR in this period.

== Media ==
- The Cowboy Cavalry: The Story of the Rocky Mountain Rangers by Gordon E. Tolton Heritage House (Aug. 24 2011)
- "Rocky Mountain Rangers" by Colter Wall from album: Western Swing & Waltzes and Other Punchy Songs (2020)
