= Battle of the Somme order of battle =

Battle of the Somme
- Part of the Western Front of the First World War
- Battle of the Somme 1 July – 18 November 1916.
Date	1 July – 18 November 1916
Location	Somme river, north-central Somme and south-eastern Pas-de-Calais départements, France 50°1′N 2°41′E
Result	Inconclusive

Belligerents
British Empire: Australia; Bermuda; Canada; India; Newfoundland; New Zealand; South Africa; Southern Rhodesia; United Kingdom; France	German Empire: Baden; Bavaria; Prussia; Saxony; Württemberg

Commanders and leaders
(United Kingdom of Great Britain and Ireland) Douglas Haig (French Third Republic) Ferdinand Foch (United Kingdom of Great Britain and Ireland) Henry Rawlinson (French Third Republic) Émile Fayolle (United Kingdom of Great Britain and Ireland) Hubert Gough (French Third Republic) Joseph Alfred Micheler	(German Empire) Crown Prince Rupprecht of Bavaria (German Empire) Max von Gallwitz (German Empire) Fritz von Below

Strength
13 British, 11 French divisions 1 July; 51 British, 48 French divisions July–November	10 1/2 divisions 1 July; 50 divisions July–November

Casualties and losses
623,907	c. 237,000–500,000

This is the order of battle for the Battle of the Somme. The Battle of the Somme was an offensive fought on the Western Front during World War I from 1 July to 18 November 1916 as one of the greatest engagements of the war. It was fought between French, British and Dominion forces and the German Empire in the Somme River valley and vicinity in northern France.

== Background ==
=== British and Dominion forces ===
In typical British county regiments, the 1st and 2nd Battalions were regular army, the 3rd was the special reserve battalion which did not normally serve overseas but remained at home as the regimental depot and training unit, from which replacements were sent to the regular battalions. The 4th, 5th and 6th Battalions were normally Territorial Force battalions. Amongst the terms of service in the Territorial Force, service outside the United Kingdom was voluntary. Territorial battalions raised second line battalions which would be numbered 2/4th, 2/5th and 2/6th, initially from men who declined to volunteer for overseas service. The number of battalions depended on the recruitment potential of the area from which the battalions were raised (the Dorsetshire Regiment raised eleven battalions, whilst the London Regiment managed to raise eighty-eight battalions). Regular army divisions were numbered 1st to 8th. "New Army" divisions of Kitchener's Army raised after the outbreak of war were numbered 9th to 26th. The 27th to 29th Divisions were Regular army divisions made up from units recalled from garrisons around the empire. The 30th to 41st were New Army and the 42nd to 74th were Territorial. The 63rd Division (Royal Naval Division) was made up from Naval Reserves and did not follow this numbering pattern.

=== Army and Corps organisation ===
==== Army ====
- British Expeditionary Force: Commander: General Sir Douglas Haig (since 10 December 1915)
  - Third Army: Army Commander: General Sir Edmund Allenby
  - Fourth Army: The Fourth Army was formed on 5 February 1916. Army Commander: General Sir Henry Rawlinson.
  - Reserve Army: The Reserve Army was formed on 23 May 1916 and took over VIII and X Corps from the Fourth Army on 4 July 1916, during the Battle of Albert. Army Commander: General Sir Hubert Gough
  - Fifth Army: The Reserve Army was renamed the Fifth Army on 30 October 1916

==== Corps ====
- II Corps. Corps Commander: Lieutenant-General Claud Jacob
- III Corps. Corps Commander: Major-General Henry Hudson later replaced by Lieutenant-General Sir William Pulteney
- V Corps. Corps Commander: Lieutenant-General Edward Fanshawe
- VII Corps. Corps Commander: Lieutenant-General Sir Thomas d'Oyly Snow
- VIII Corps. Corps Commander: Lieutenant-General Aylmer Hunter-Weston
- X Corps. Corps Commander: Lieutenant-General Sir Thomas Morland
- XIII Corps. Corps Commander: Lieutenant-General Walter Congreve VC
- XIV Corps. Corps Commander: Lieutenant-General Rudolph Lambart, 10th Earl of Cavan
- XV Corps. Corps Commander: Lieutenant General D.M.G. Campbell, then Lt–Gen Henry Horne then Lt–General John Du Cane
- Canadian Corps. Corps Commander: Lieutenant-General the Honourable Sir Julian Byng
- ANZAC Corps. Corps Commander: Lieutenant-General Sir William Birdwood
- Machine Gun Corps

=== Formations per battle ===
Refer following section titled "Divisions" for brigades, regiments and battalions associated with each division participating in the listed battles. Battle nomenclature and participating units information taken from source British Army Council Command Notice 1138 unless stated.

Colour coding for division type
Regular Army and Naval divisions	New Army divisions recruited under Kitchener Recruitment Plan	Territorial divisions	Dominion divisions

==== Battle of Albert: 1–13 July ====
- Capture of Montauban
- Capture of Mametz
- Capture of Fricourt
- Capture of Contalmaison
- Capture of La Boisselle

Organization of the Fourth Army on the First day of the Battle of the Somme, 1 July 1916

Army	Corps	Divisions
Fourth Army	III Corps	1st Division
Fourth Army	III Corps	8th Division
Fourth Army	III Corps	12th Division
Fourth Army	III Corps	19th Division
Fourth Army	III Corps	34th Division
Fourth Army	VIII Corps	4th Division
Fourth Army	VIII Corps	29th Division
Fourth Army	VIII Corps	31st Division
Fourth Army	VIII Corps	48th Division
Fourth Army	X Corps	23rd Division
Fourth Army	X Corps	25th Division
Fourth Army	X Corps	32nd Division
Fourth Army	X Corps	36th Division
Fourth Army	X Corps	49th Division
Fourth Army	XIII Corps	3rd Division
Fourth Army	XIII Corps	9th Division
Fourth Army	XIII Corps	18th Division
Fourth Army	XIII Corps	30th Division
Fourth Army	XIII Corps	35th Division
Fourth Army	XV Corps	7th Division
Fourth Army	XV Corps	17th Division
Fourth Army	XV Corps	21st Division
Fourth Army	XV Corps	33rd Division
Fourth Army	XV Corps	38th Division
Fourth Army	Reserve Army	The Reserve Army took over the VIII and X Corps from the Fourth Army on 4 July 1916

===== Subsidiary Attack on the Gommecourt Salient: 1 July =====
Army	Corps	Divisions
Third Army	VII Corps	37th Division
Third Army	VII Corps	46th Division
Third Army	VII Corps	56th Division

==== Battle of Bazentin Ridge: 14–17 July ====
- Capture of Longueval
- Capture of Trônes Wood
- Capture of Ovillers

Army	Corps	Divisions
Fourth Army	Army Troops	2nd Indian Cavalry Division
Fourth Army	II Corps	1st Division
Fourth Army	II Corps	23rd Division
Fourth Army	II Corps	34th Division (Note: The 102nd and 103rd Infantry Brigades of the 34th Division had suffered many losses in the Battle of Albert, 1916, changed places with the 111th and 112th Infantry Brigades of the 37th Division and went into line with the 37th Division, IV Corps, First Army on Vimy Ridge, while the two 37th Division brigades, fought in the battles of Bazentin and Pozières under the 34th Division. (Liddle p. 176))
Fourth Army	XIII Corps	3rd Division
Fourth Army	XIII Corps	9th Division
Fourth Army	XIII Corps	18th Division
Fourth Army	XV Corps	7th Division
Fourth Army	XV Corps	21st Division
Fourth Army	XV Corps	33rd Division
Reserve Army	X Corps	25th Division
Reserve Army	X Corps	32nd Division
Reserve Army	X Corps	48th Division
Reserve Army	X Corps	49th Division

===== Subsidiary Attack at Fromelles: 19 July =====
Army	Corps	Divisions
First Army	XI Corps	61st Division
First Army	XI Corps	5th Australian Division

===== Subsidiary Attacks on High Wood: 20–25 July =====
Army	Corps	Divisions
Fourth Army	III Corps	19th Division
Fourth Army	XV Corps	5th Division
Fourth Army	XV Corps	7th Division
Fourth Army	XV Corps	33rd Division
Fourth Army	XV Corps	51st Division

==== Battle of Delville Wood: 15 July – 3 September ====
Army	Corps	Divisions
Fourth Army	XIII Corps	2nd Division
Fourth Army	XIII Corps	3rd Division
Fourth Army	XIII Corps	9th Division
Fourth Army	XIII Corps	18th (Eastern) Division
Fourth Army	XIII Corps	24th Division
Fourth Army	XIII Corps	53rd Bde, 18th Division
Fourth Army	XIV Corps	20th Division
Fourth Army	XIV Corps	24th Division
Fourth Army	XV Corps	7th Division
Fourth Army	XV Corps	14th Division

==== Battle of Pozières: 23 July – 3 September ====
- Fighting for Mouquet Farm

Army	Corps	Divisions
Fourth Army	III Corps	1st Division
Fourth Army	III Corps	15th Division
Fourth Army	III Corps	19th Division
Fourth Army	III Corps	23rd Division
Fourth Army	III Corps	34th Division
Reserve Army	II Corps	12th Division
Reserve Army	II Corps	25th Division
Reserve Army	II Corps	48th Division
Reserve Army	II Corps	49th Division
Reserve Army	1 ANZAC Corps	1st Australian Division
Reserve Army	1 ANZAC Corps	2nd Australian Division
Reserve Army	1 ANZAC Corps	4th Australian Division

==== Battle of Guillemont: 3–6 September ====
Army	Corps	Divisions
Fourth Army	XIV Corps	5th Division
Fourth Army	XIV Corps	16th Division
Fourth Army	XIV Corps	20th Division
Fourth Army	XV Corps	7th Division
Fourth Army	XV Corps	24th Division
Fourth Army	XV Corps	55th Division

==== Battle of Ginchy: 9 September ====
Army	Corps	Divisions
Fourth Army	XIV Corps	16th Division
Fourth Army	XIV Corps	56th Division
Fourth Army	XV Corps	55th Division

==== Battle of Flers-Courcelette: 15–22 September ====
- Capture of Martinpuich

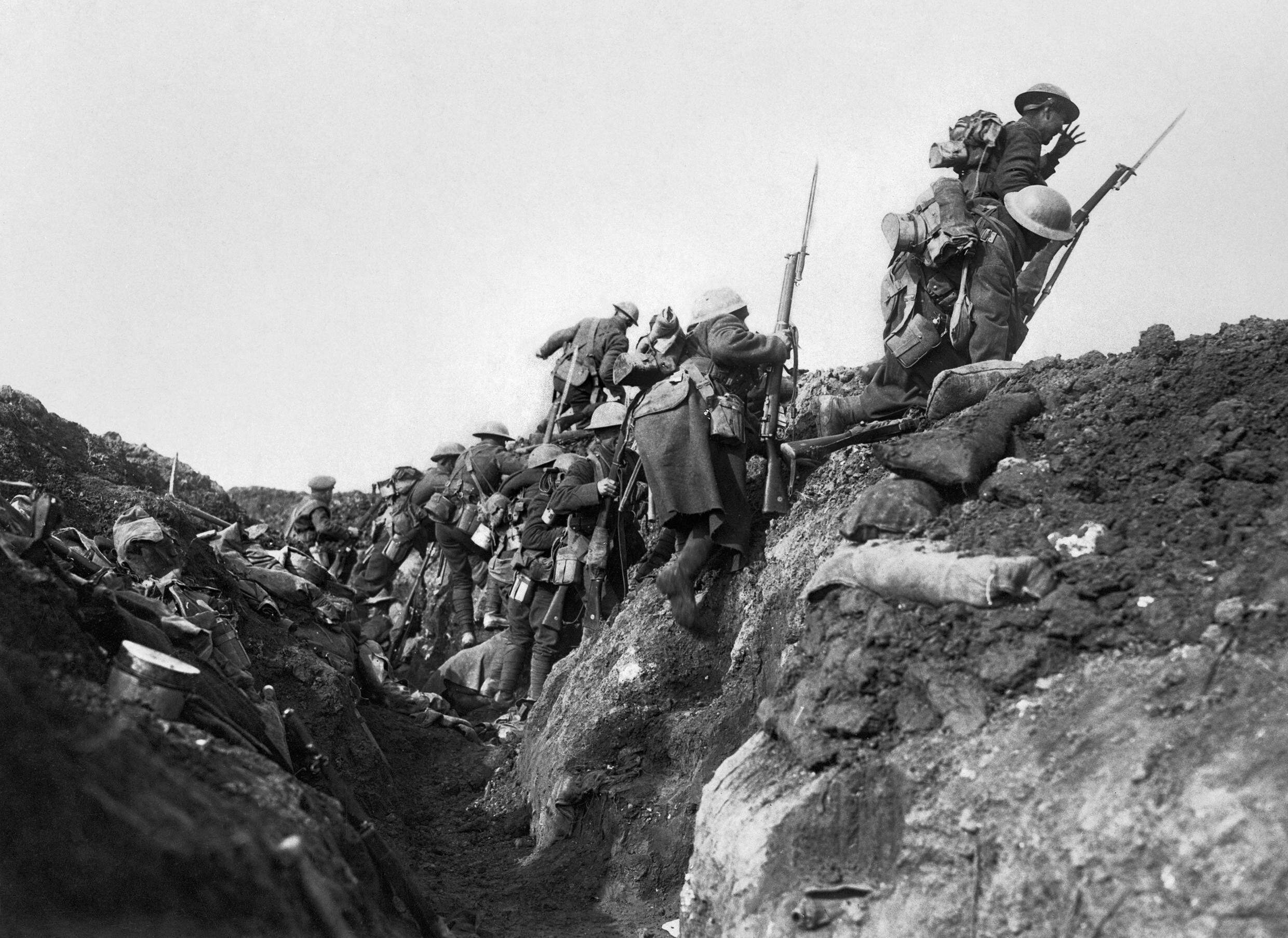
Canadian soldiers going over the top

Army	Corps	Divisions
Fourth Army	Army Troops	1st Cavalry Division
Fourth Army	Army Troops	2nd Indian Cavalry Division
Fourth Army	III Corps	1st Division
Fourth Army	III Corps	15th Division
Fourth Army	III Corps	23rd Division
Fourth Army	III Corps	47th Division
Fourth Army	III Corps	50th Division
Fourth Army	III Corps	103rd Bde, 34th Division
Fourth Army	XIV Corps	Guards Division
Fourth Army	XIV Corps	5th Division
Fourth Army	XIV Corps	6th Division
Fourth Army	XIV Corps	20th Division
Fourth Army	XIV Corps	56th Division
Fourth Army	XV Corps	14th Division
Fourth Army	XV Corps	21st Division
Fourth Army	XV Corps	41st Division
Fourth Army	XV Corps	55th Division
Fourth Army	XV Corps	New Zealand Division
Reserve Army	II Corps	11th Division
Reserve Army	II Corps	49th Division
Reserve Army	Canadian Corps	1st Canadian Division
Reserve Army	Canadian Corps	2nd Canadian Division
Reserve Army	Canadian Corps	3rd Canadian Division

==== Battle of Morval: 25–28 September ====
- Capture of Combles
- Capture of Lesbœufs
- Capture of Gueudecourt

Army	Corps	Divisions
Fourth Army	III Corps	1st Division
Fourth Army	III Corps	23rd Division
Fourth Army	III Corps	50th Division
Fourth Army	XIV Corps	Guards Division
Fourth Army	XIV Corps	5th Division
Fourth Army	XIV Corps	6th Division
Fourth Army	XIV Corps	20th Division
Fourth Army	XIV Corps	56th Division
Fourth Army	XV Corps	21st Division
Fourth Army	XV Corps	55th Division
Fourth Army	XV Corps	New Zealand Division

==== Battle of Thiepval: 26–28 September ====
Army	Corps	Divisions
Reserve Army	II Corps	11th Division
Reserve Army	II Corps	18th Division
Reserve Army	V Corps	39th Division
Reserve Army	Canadian Corps	1st Canadian Division
Reserve Army	Canadian Corps	2nd Canadian Division
Reserve Army	Canadian Corps	3rd Canadian Division

==== Battle of Le Transloy: 1–18 October ====
- Capture of Eaucourt l'Abbaye
- Capture of Le Sars
- Attacks on the Butte de Warlencourt

Army	Corps	Divisions
Fourth Army	III Corps	9th Division
Fourth Army	III Corps	15th Division
Fourth Army	III Corps	23rd Division
Fourth Army	III Corps	47th Division
Fourth Army	III Corps	50th Division
Fourth Army	XIV Corps	4th Division
Fourth Army	XIV Corps	6th Division
Fourth Army	XIV Corps	20th Division
Fourth Army	XIV Corps	56th Division
Fourth Army	XV Corps	12th Division
Fourth Army	XV Corps	21st Division
Fourth Army	XV Corps	30th Division
Fourth Army	XV Corps	41st Division
Fourth Army	XV Corps	New Zealand Division
Fourth Army	XV Corps	88th Bde of 29th Division
Reserve Army	Canadian Corps	1st Canadian Division
Reserve Army	Canadian Corps	2nd Canadian Division
Reserve Army	Canadian Corps	3rd Canadian Division
Reserve Army	Canadian Corps	4th Canadian Division

==== Battle of the Ancre Heights: 1–18 October ====
- Capture of Schwaben Redoubt
- Capture of Stuff Redoubt
- Capture of Regina Trench

Army	Corps	Divisions
Reserve Army	II Corps	18th Division
Reserve Army	II Corps	19th Division
Reserve Army	II Corps	25th Division
Reserve Army	II Corps	39th Division
Reserve Army	II Corps	4th Canadian Division
Reserve Army	V Corps	39th Division

==== Battle of the Ancre: 13–16 November ====
- Capture of Beaumont-Hamel

Army	Corps	Divisions
Fourth Army	III Corps	48th Division
Fifth Army	II Corps	18th Division
Fifth Army	II Corps	19th Division
Fifth Army	II Corps	39th Division
Fifth Army	II Corps	4th Canadian Division
Fifth Army	V Corps	2nd Division
Fifth Army	V Corps	3rd Division
Fifth Army	V Corps	32nd Division
Fifth Army	V Corps	37th Division
Fifth Army	V Corps	51st Division
Fifth Army	V Corps	63rd Naval Division
Fifth Army	XIII Corps	31st Division
Fifth Army	XIII Corps	120th Bde, 40th Division

=== Divisions ===
==== Regular Army and Naval divisions ====
Guards Division	Major-General Geoffrey Feilding	
1st Guards Brigade	2nd Guards Brigade	3rd Guards Brigade
2nd Battalion, Grenadier Guards	3rd Battalion, Grenadier Guards	1st Battalion, Grenadier Guards
2nd Battalion, Coldstream Guards	1st Battalion, Coldstream Guards	4th Battalion, Grenadier Guards
3rd Battalion, Coldstream Guards	1st Battalion, Scots Guards	2nd Battalion, Scots Guards
1st Battalion, Irish Guards	2nd Battalion, Irish Guards	1st Battalion, Welsh Guards
Pioneers	4th Battalion, Coldstream Guards	

1st Division	Major-General Peter Strickland	
1st Brigade	2nd Brigade	3rd Brigade
10th Battalion, Gloucestershire Regiment	2nd Battalion, Royal Sussex Regiment	1st Battalion, South Wales Borderers
1st Battalion, Black Watch	1 Battalion, Loyal North Lancashire Regiment	1st Battalion, Gloucestershire Regiment
8th Battalion, Royal Berkshire Regiment	1st Battalion, Northamptonshire Regiment	2nd Battalion, Welsh Regiment
1st Battalion, Queen's Own Cameron Highlanders	2nd Battalion, King's Royal Rifle Corps	2nd Battalion, Royal Munster Fusiliers
Pioneers	1/6th Battalion, Welch Regiment	

2nd Division	Major General Cecil Pereira	
5th Brigade	6th Brigade	99th Brigade
17th Battalion, Royal Fusiliers	1st Battalion, King's (Liverpool) Regiment	22nd Battalion, Royal Fusiliers
24th Battalion, Royal Fusiliers	2nd Battalion, South Staffordshire Regiment	23rd Battalion, Royal Fusiliers
2nd Battalion, Oxfordshire & Buckinghamshire Light Infantry	13th Battalion, Essex Regiment	1st Battalion, Royal Berkshire Regiment
2nd Battalion, Highland Light Infantry	17th Battalion, Middlesex Regiment	1st Battalion, King's Royal Rifle Corps
Pioneers	10th Battalion, Duke of Cornwall’s Light Infantry	

3rd Division	Major-General Aylmer Haldane then Major-General Cyril Deverell	
8th Brigade	9th Brigade	76th Brigade
2nd Battalion, Royal Scots	1st Battalion, Northumberland Fusiliers	8th Battalion, King’s Own Royal Regiment
8th Battalion, East Yorkshire Regiment	4th Battalion, Royal Fusiliers	2nd Battalion, Suffolk Regiment
1st Battalion, Royal Scots Fusiliers	13th Battalion, King’s Regiment	10th Battalion, Royal Welsh Fusiliers
7th Battalion, King's Shropshire Light Infantry	12th Battalion, West Yorkshire Regiment	1st Battalion, Gordon Highlanders
Pioneers	20th Battalion, King’s Royal Rifle Corps	

4th Division	Major-General The Honourable William Lambton	
10th Brigade	11th Brigade	12th Brigade
1st Battalion, Royal Warwickshire Regiment	1st Battalion, Somerset Light Infantry	1st Battalion, King’s Own Royal Regiment
2nd Battalion, Seaforth Highlanders	1st Battalion, East Lancashires	2nd Battalion, Lancashire Fusiliers
1st Battalion, Royal Irish Fusiliers	1st Battalion, Hampshire Regiment	2nd Battalion, Essex Regiment
2nd Battalion, Royal Dublin Fusiliers	1st Battalion, Rifle Brigade	2nd Battalion, Duke of Wellington’s Regiment
Pioneers	21st Battalion, West Yorkshire Regiment	

5th Division	Major-General Reginald Stephens	
13th Brigade	15th Brigade	95th Brigade
14th Battalion, Royal Warwickshire Regiment	16th Battalion, Royal Warwickshire Regiment	1st Battalion, Devon Regiment
15th Battalion, Royal Warwickshire Regiment	1st Battalion, Norfolk Regiment	12th Battalion, Gloucestershire Regiment
2nd Battalion, King’s Own Scottish Borderers	1st Battalion, Bedford Regiment	1st Battalion, East Surrey Regiment
1st Battalion, Royal West Kent Regiment	1st Battalion, Cheshire Regiment	1st Battalion, Duke of Cornwall’s Light Infantry
Pioneers	1/6th Battalion, Argyll & Sutherland Highlanders	

6th Division	Major-General Charles Ross	
16th Brigade	18th Brigade	71st Brigade
1st Battalion, Buffs (Royal East Kent Regiment)	1st Battalion, West Yorkshire Regiment	9th Battalion, Norfolk Regiment
8th Battalion, Bedfordshire Regiment	11th Battalion, Essex Regiment	9th Battalion, Suffolk Regiment
1st Battalion, King's Shropshire Light Infantry	2nd Battalion, Durham Light Infantry	1st Battalion, Leicestershire Regiment
2nd Battalion, York and Lancaster Regiment	14th Battalion, Durham Light Infantry	2nd Battalion, Sherwood Foresters
Pioneers	11th Royal Leicester Regiment	

7th Division	Major General Herbert Watts	
20th Brigade	22nd Brigade	91st Brigade
8th Battalion, Devonshire Regiment	2nd Battalion, Royal Warwickshire Regiment	2nd Battalion, Queen's
9th Battalion, Devonshire Regiment	2nd Battalion, Royal Irish Regiment	1st Battalion, South Staffordshire Regiment
2nd Battalion, Border Regiment	2nd Battalion, Royal Welch Fusiliers	21st Battalion, Manchester Regiment
2nd Battalion, Gordon Highlanders	20th Battalion, Manchester Regiment	22nd Battalion, Manchester Regiment
Pioneers	24th Battalion, Manchester Regiment	

8th Division	Major-General Havelock Hudson	
23rd Brigade	24th Brigade	25th Brigade
2nd Battalion, Devonshire Regiment	1st Battalion, Worcestershire Regiment	2nd Battalion, Lincolnshire Regiment
2nd Battalion, West Yorkshire Regiment	1st Battalion, Sherwood Foresters	2nd Battalion, Royal Berkshire Regiment
2nd Battalion, Middlesex Regiment	2nd Battalion, Northamptonshire Regiment	1st Battalion, Royal Irish Rifles
2nd Battalion, Scottish Rifles	2nd Battalion, East Lancashire Regiment	2nd Battalion, Rifle Brigade
Pioneers	22nd Battalion, Durham Light Infantry	

29th Division	Major-General Henry de Lisle	
86th Brigade	87th Brigade	88th Brigade
2nd Battalion, Royal Fusiliers	2nd Battalion, South Wales Borderers	4th Battalion, Worcestershire Regiment
1st Battalion, Lancashire Fusiliers	1st Battalion, King's Own Scottish Borderers	1st Battalion, Essex Regiment
16th Battalion, Middlesex Regiment	1st Battalion, Royal Inniskilling Fusiliers	2nd Battalion, Hampshire Regiment
1st Battalion, Royal Dublin Fusiliers	1st Battalion, Border Regiment	1st Battalion, Royal Newfoundland Regiment (Dominion of Newfoundland)
Pioneers	2nd Battalion, Monmouthshire Regiment	

63rd (Royal Naval) Division	Major General George Forestier-Walker	
188th (Royal Naval) Brigade	189th (Royal Naval) Brigade	190th Brigade
Anson Battalion	Drake Battalion	1/1st Battalion, Honourable Artillery Company
Howe Battalion	Hood Battalion	7th Battalion, Royal Fusiliers
1st Royal Marine Battalion	Nelson Battalion	4th Battalion, Bedfordshire Regiment
2nd Royal Marine Battalion	Hawke Battalion	10th Battalion, Royal Dublin Fusiliers

==== New Army divisions ====
9th (Scottish) Division	Major-General William Furse	
26th Brigade (United Kingdom)	27th Brigade (United Kingdom)	South African Brigade (South Africa)
8th Battalion, Black Watch	11th Battalion, Royal Scots	1st South African Battalion (Cape)
9th Battalion, Seaforth	12th Battalion, Royal Scots	2nd South African Battalion (Natal & OFS)
5th Battalion, Camerons	6th Battalion, King's Own Scottish Borderers	3rd South African Battalion (Transvaal & Rhodesia)
10th Battalion, Argyll & Sutherland Highlanders	9th Battalion, Scottish Rifles	4th South African Battalion (Scottish)
Pioneers	9th Battalion, Seaforth Highlanders	

11th (Northern) Division (United Kingdom)	Major-General Charles Woollcombe	
32nd Brigade	33rd Brigade	34th Brigade
9th Battalion, West Yorkshire Regiment	6th Battalion, Lincolnshire Regiment	8th Battalion, Northumberland Fusiliers
6th Battalion, Green Howards	6th Battalion, Border Regiment	9th Battalion, Lancashire Fusiliers
8th Battalion, Duke of Wellington's Regiment	7th Battalion, South Staffordshire Regiment	5th Battalion, Dorsetshire Regiment
6th Battalion, York & Lancaster Regiment	9th Battalion, Sherwood Foresters	11th Battalion, Manchester Regiment
Pioneers	6th Battalion, East Yorkshire Regiment	

12th (Eastern) Division (United Kingdom)	Major-General Arthur Scott	
35th Brigade	36th Brigade	37th Brigade
7th Battalion, Norfolk Regiment	8th Battalion, Royal Fusiliers	6th Battalion, Queen's Regiment
7th Battalion, Suffolk Regiment	9th Battalion, Royal Fusiliers	6th Battalion, Buffs (Royal East Kent Regiment)
9th Battalion, Essex Regiment	7th Battalion, Royal Sussex Regiment	7th Battalion, East Surrey Regiment
5th Battalion, Royal Berkshire Regiment	11th Battalion, Middlesex Regiment	6th Battalion, Royal West Kent Regiment
Pioneers	5th Battalion, Northamptonshire Regiment	

14th (Light) Division (United Kingdom)	Major-General Victor Couper	
41st Brigade	42nd Brigade	43rd Brigade
7th Battalion, King's Royal Rifle Corps	5th Battalion, Oxfordshire & Buckinghamshire Regt	6th Battalion, Somerset Light Infantry
8th Battalion, King's Royal Rifle Corps	5th Battalion, King's Shropshire Light Infantry	6th Battalion, Duke of Cornwall's Lt.Inf.
7th Battalion, Rifle Brigade	9th Battalion, King's Royal Rifle Corps	6th Battalion, King's Own Yorkshire Lt.Inf.
8th Battalion, Rifle Brigade	9th Battalion, Rifle Brigade	10th Battalion, Durham Light Infantry
Pioneers	11th Battalion, King's Regiment	

15th (Scottish) Division (United Kingdom)	Major-General Frederick McCracken	
44th Brigade	45th Brigade	46th Brigade
9th Battalion, Black Watch	13th Battalion, Royal Scots	10th Battalion, Scottish Rifles
8th Battalion, Seaforth	6/7th Battalion, Royal Scots Fusiliers	7/8th Battalion, King's Own Scottish Borderers
10th Battalion, Gordon Highlanders	6th Battalion, Camerons	10/11th Battalion, Highland Light Infantry
7th Battalion, Camerons	11th Battalion, Argyll & Sutherland Highlanders	12/11th Battalion, Highland Light Infantry
Pioneers	9th Battalion, Gordon Highlanders	

16th (Irish) Division (United Kingdom)	Major-General William Hickie	
47th Brigade	48th Brigade	49th Brigade
6th Battalion, Royal Irish Regiment	7th Battalion, Royal Irish Rifles	7th Battalion, Royal Inniskilling Fusiliers
6th Battalion, Connaught Rangers	1st Battalion, Royal Munster Fusiliers	8th Battalion, Royal Inniskilling Fusiliers
7th Battalion, Leinster Regiment	8th Battalion, Royal Dublin Fusiliers	7th Battalion, Royal Irish Fusiliers
8th Battalion, Royal Munster Fusiliers	9th Battalion, Royal Dublin Fusiliers	8th Battalion, Royal Irish Fusiliers
Pioneers	11th Battalion, Hampshire Regiment	

17th (Northern) Division (United Kingdom)	Major-General Thomas Pilcher, since 13 July Major-General Philip Rynd Robertson	
50th Brigade	51st Brigade	52nd Brigade
10th Battalion, West Yorkshire Regiment	7th Battalion, Lincolnshire Regiment	9th Battalion, Northumberland Fusiliers
7th Battalion, East Yorkshire Regiment	7th Battalion, Border Regiment	10th Battalion, Lancashire Fusiliers
7th Battalion, Green Howards	8th Battalion, South Staffordshire Regiment	9th Battalion, Duke of Wellington's Regiment
6th Battalion, Dorset Regiment	10th Battalion, Sherwood Foresters	12th Battalion, Manchester Regiment
Pioneers	7th Battalion, York and Lancaster Regiment	

18th (Eastern) Division (United Kingdom)	Major General Ivor Maxse	
53rd Brigade	54th Brigade	55th Brigade
8th Battalion, Norfolk Regiment	11th Battalion, Royal Fusiliers	7th Battalion, Queen's Regiment
8th Battalion, Suffolk Regiment	7th Battalion, Bedford Regiment	7th Battalion, Buffs
10th Battalion, Essex Regiment	8th Battalion, Northamptonshire Regiment	8th Battalion, East Surrey Regiment
6th Battalion, Royal Berkshire Regiment	12th Battalion, Middlesex Regiment	7th Battalion, Royal West Kent Regiment
Pioneers	8th Battalion, Royal Sussex Regiment	

19th (Western) Division (United Kingdom)	Major-General Tom Bridges	
56th Brigade	57th Brigade	58th Brigade
7th Battalion, Kings Own	10th Battalion, Royal Warwick Regiment	9th Battalion, Cheshire Regiment
7th Battalion, East Lancashire Regiment	8th Battalion, Gloucestershire Regiment	9th Battalion, Royal Welch Fusiliers
7th Battalion, South Lancashire Regiment	10th Battalion, Worcesters	9th Battalion, Welch Regiment
7th Battalion, North Lancashire Regiment	8th Battalion, North Staffordshire Regiment	6th Battalion, Wiltshire Regiment
Pioneers	5th Battalion, South Wales Border Regiment	

20th (Light) Division (United Kingdom)	Major-General William Douglas-Smith	
59th Brigade	60th Brigade	61st Brigade
10th Battalion, King's Royal Rifle Corps	6th Battalion, Oxford & Buckinghamshire Lt. Regt	7th Battalion, Somerset Lt.Inf.
11th Battalion, King's Royal Rifle Corps	6th Battalion, King's Stropshire Lt. Inf.	7th Battalion, Duke of Cornwall's Lt.Inf.
10th Battalion, Rifle Brigade	12th Battalion, King's Royal Rifle Corps	7th Battalion, King's Own Yorkshire Lt.Inf.
11th Battalion, Rifle Brigade	12th Battalion, Rifle Brigade	12th Battalion, King's Regiment
Pioneers	11th Battalion, Durham Light Infantry	

21st Division (United Kingdom)	Major-General David Campbell	
62nd Brigade	63rd Brigade	64th Brigade
12th Battalion, Northumberland Fusiliers	8th Battalion, Lincolnshire Regiment	9th Battalion, King's Own Yorkshire Lt.Inf.
13th Battalion, Northumberland Fusiliers	8th Battalion, Somerset Lt. Inf.	10th Battalion, King's Own Yorkshire Lt.Inf.
1st Battalion, Lincolnshire Regiment	12th Bn, Prince of Wales' Own West Yorkshires	14th Battalion, Durham Light Infantry
10th Bn, Princess of Wales's Own Yorkshire Regt	10th Bn, York and Lancaster Regiment	15th Bn, Durham Light Infantry
Pioneers	14th Battalion, Northumberland Fusiliers	
110th Brigade	The 110th Brigade replaced the 63rd Brigade in July 1916	
6th Bn, Leicestershire Regiment	7th Bn, Leicestershire Regiment	8th Battalion, Leicestershire Regiment
9th Battalion, Leicestershire Regiment

23rd Division (United Kingdom)	Major-General James Babington	
68th Brigade	69th Brigade	70th Brigade
10th Battalion, Northumberland Fusiliers	11th Battalion, West Yorkshire Regiment	11th Battalion, Sherwood Foresters
11th Battalion, Northumberland Fusiliers	8th Battalion, Green Howards	8th Battalion, King's Own Yorkshire Light Infantry
12th Battalion, Durham Light Infantry	9th Battalion, Green Howards	8th Battalion, York and Lancaster Regiment
13th Battalion, Durham Light Infantry	10th Battalion, Duke of Wellington Regiment	9th Battalion, York and Lancaster Regiment
Pioneers	9th Battalion, South Staffordshire Regiment	

24th Division (United Kingdom)	Major-General John Capper	
17th Brigade	72nd Brigade	73rd Brigade
8th Battalion, Buffs	8th Battalion, Queen's Regiment	9th Battalion, Royal Sussex Regiment
1st Battalion, Royal Fusiliers	9th Battalion, East Surrey Regiment	7th Battalion, Northamptonshire Regiment
12th Battalion, Royal Fusiliers	8th Battalion, Royal West Kent Regt.	13th Battalion, Middlesex Regiment
3rd Battalion, Rifle Brigade	1st Battalion, North Staffordshire Regt.	2nd Battalion, Leinster Regiment
Pioneers	12th Battalion, Sherwood Foresters	

25th Division (United Kingdom)	Major-General Guy Bainbridge	
7th Brigade	74th Brigade	75th Brigade
10th Battalion, Cheshire Regiment	11th Battalion, Lancashire Fusiliers	11th Battalion, Cheshire Regiment
3rd Battalion, Worcester Regiment	13th Battalion, Cheshire Regiment	8th Battalion, Border Regiment
8th Battalion, Loyal North Lancashire Regiment	9th Battalion, Loyal North Lancashire Regiment	2nd Battalion, South Lancashire Regiment
1st Battalion, Wiltshire Regiment	2nd Battalion, Royal Irish Rifles Regiment	8th Battalion, South Lancashire Regiment
Pioneers	6th Battalion, South Wales Border Regiment	

30th Division (United Kingdom)	Brigadier-General Ferdinand Stanley	
21st Brigade	89th Brigade	90th Brigade
18th Battalion, King's Own Royal Regiment	17th Battalion, King's (Liverpool) Regiment	16th Battalion (1st City) Manchester Regiment
19th Battalion (4th City) Manchester Regiment	19th Battalion, King's (Liverpool)Regiment	17th Battalion (2nd City) Manchester Regiment
2nd Battalion, Princess of Wales' Own Yorkshire Regt	20th Battalion, King's (Liverpool) Regiment	18th Battalion (3rd City) Manchester Regiment
2nd Battalion, Duke of Edinburgh's Wiltshire Regiment	2nd Battalion, Bedfordshire Regiment	2nd Battalion, Royal Scots Fusiliers
Pioneers	11th Battalion (St.Helens Pioneers) Prince of Wales's Volunteers	

31st Division (United Kingdom)	Major-General Wanless O'Gowan	
92nd Brigade	93rd Brigade	94th Brigade
10th Battalion, East Yorkshire Regiment	15th Battalion, West Yorkshire Regiment	11th Battalion, East Lancaster Regiment
11th Battalion, East Yorkshire Regiment	16th Battalion, West Yorkshire Regiment	12th Battalion, York & Lancaster Regiment
12th Battalion, East Yorkshire Regiment	18th Battalion, West Yorkshire Regiment	13th Battalion, York & Lancaster Regiment
13th Battalion, East Yorkshire Regiment	18th Battalion, Durham Light Infantry	14th Battalion, York & Lancaster Regiment
Pioneers	12th Battalion, King's Own Yorkshire Light Infantry Regiment	

32nd Division (United Kingdom)	Major-General Reginald Barnes	
14th Brigade	96th Brigade	97th Brigade
19th Battalion, Lancashire Fusiliers	16th Battalion, Northumberland Fusiliers	11th Battalion, Border Regiment
1st Battalion, Dorsetshire Regiment	15th Battalion, Lancashire Fusiliers	2nd Battalion, King's Own Yorkshire Light Inf.
2nd Battalion, Manchester Regiment	16th Battalion, Lancashire Fusiliers	16th Battalion, Highland Light Infantry
15th Battalion, Highland Light Infantry	2nd Battalion, Royal Inniskilling Fusiliers	17th Battalion, Highland Light Infantry
Pioneers	17th Battalion, Northumberland Fusiliers	

33rd Division (United Kingdom)	Major-General Reginald Pinney	
98th Brigade	100th Brigade	19th Brigade
4th Battalion, King's (Liverpool) Regiment	1st Battalion, Queen's (Royal West Surrey) Regiment	20th Battalion, Royal Fusiliers
1/4th Battalion, Suffolk Regiment	2nd Battalion, Worcestershire Regiment	2nd Battalion, Royal Welch Fusiliers
1st Battalion, Middlesex Regiment	16th Battalion, King's Royal Rifle Corps	1st Battalion, The Cameronians (Scottish Rifles)
2nd Battalion, Argyll & Sutherland Highlanders	1/9th Battalion, Highland Light Infantry	1/5th Battalion, The Cameronians (Scottish Rifles)
Pioneers	18th Battalion, Middlesex Regiment	

34th Division (United Kingdom)	Major-General Edward Ingouville-Williams (killed) then Major-General Lothian Nicholson	
101st Brigade	102nd Tyneside Scottish Brigade	103rd Tyneside Irish Brigade
15th Battalion, Royal Scots	20th Battalion, Northumberland Fusiliers	24th Battalion, Northumberland Fusiliers
16th Battalion, Royal Scots	21st Battalion, Northumberland Fusiliers	25th Battalion, Northumberland Fusiliers
10th Battalion, Lincoln Regiment	22nd Battalion, Northumberland Fusiliers	26th Battalion, Northumberland Fusiliers
11th Battalion, Suffolk Regiment (Note: The Cambridgeshire Battalion)	23rd Battalion, Northumberland Fusiliers	27th Battalion, Northumberland Fusiliers
Pioneers	18th Battalion, Northumberland Fusiliers	

35th Division (United Kingdom)	Major-General Herman Landon	
104th Brigade	105th Brigade	106th Brigade
17th Battalion, Lancashire Fusiliers	15th Battalion, Cheshire Regiment	17th Battalion, Royal Scots Regiment
18th Battalion, Lancashire Fusiliers	16th Battalion, Cheshire Regiment	17th Battalion, West Yorkshire Regiment
20th Battalion, Lancashire Fusiliers	14th Battalion, Gloster Regiment	19th Battalion, Durham Light Infantry
23rd Battalion, Manchester Regiment	15th Battalion, Sherwood Foresters	18th Battalion, Highland Light Infantry
Pioneers	19th Battalion, Northumberland Fusiliers	

36th (Ulster) Division (United Kingdom)	Major-General Oliver Nugent	
107th Brigade	108th Brigade	109th Brigade
8th Bn, (East Belfast), Royal Irish Rifles	9th Bn, (Armagh, Cavan & Monaghan), Royal Irish Fusiliers	9th Bn, (County Tyrone), Royal Inniskilling Fusiliers
9th Bn, (West Belfast), Royal Irish Rifles	11th Bn, (South Antrim), Royal Irish Rifles	10th Bn, (Derry), Royal Inniskilling Fusiliers
10th Bn, (South Belfast), Royal Irish Rifles	12th Bn, (Central Antrim), Royal Irish Rifles	11th Bn, (Donegal and Fermanagh), Royal Inniskilling Fusiliers
15th Bn, (North Belfast), Royal Irish Rifles	13th Bn, (1st Co. Down), Royal Irish Rifles	14th Bn, (Young Citizens Volunteers), Royal Irish Rifles
Pioneers	16th Bn, (2nd Co. Down), Royal Irish Rifles	

37th Division (United Kingdom)	Major General Lord Edward Gleichen	
110th Brigade	111th Brigade	112th Brigade
6th Battalion, Leicester Regiment	10th Battalion, Royal Fusiliers	11th Battalion, Royal Warwick Regiment
7th Battalion, Leicester Regiment	13th Battalion, Royal Fusiliers	6th Battalion, Bedford Regiment
8th Battalion, Leicester Regiment	13th Battalion, King's Royal Rifle Corps	8th Battalion, East Lancashire Regiment
9th Battalion, Leicester Regiment	13th Battalion, Rifle Brigade	10th Battalion, Loyal North Lancashire Regiment
Pioneers	9th Battalion, North Staffordshire Regiment	

38th (Welsh) Division (United Kingdom)	Major-General Charles Blackader	
113th Brigade	114th Brigade	115th Brigade
13th Bn, (1st North Wales), Royal Welch Fusiliers	10th Battalion (1st Rhondda), Welch Regiment	17th Bn, (2nd North Wales), Royal Welch Fusiliers
14th Bn, Royal Welch Fusiliers	13th Battalion (2nd Rhondda), Welch Regiment	10th Bn, (1st Gwent), South Wales Borderers
15th Bn, (1st London Welsh), Royal Welch Fusiliers	14th Battalion (Swansea), Welch Regiment	11th Bn, (2nd Gwent), South Wales Borderers
16th Bn, Royal Welch Fusiliers	15th Battalion (Carmarthenshire), Welch Regiment	16th Bn, (Cardiff City), Welch Regiment
Pioneers	19th Battalion (Glamorgan Pioneers), Welsh Regiment	

39th Division (United Kingdom)	Major General Gerald Cuthbert	
116th Brigade	117th Brigade	118th Brigade
11th Battalion, Royal Sussex Regiment	16th Battalion, Sherwood Foresters	1/6th Battalion, Cheshire Regiment
12th Battalion, Royal Sussex Regiment	17th Battalion, Sherwood Foresters	1/1st Battalion, Cambridgeshire Regiment
13th Battalion, Royal Sussex Regiment	17th Battalion, King's Royal Rifle Corps	1/1st Battalion, Hertfordshire Regiment
14th Battalion, Hampshire Regiment	16th Battalion, Rifle Brigade	4/5th Battalion, Black Watch
Pioneers	13th Battalion, Gloucestershire Regiment	

41st Division (United Kingdom)	Major-General Sydney Barlow-Lawford	
122nd Brigade	123rd Brigade	124th Brigade
12th Bn, East Surrey Regiment (Note: The Bermondsey Battalion)	11th Bn, Queen's Royal West Surrey Regt	10th Bn, The Queen's Royal West Surrey Regt
15th Bn, Hampshire Regiment (Note: The 2nd Portsmouth Battalion)	10th Bn, Royal West Kent Regiment (Note: The Kent County Battalion)	26th Battalion, Royal Fusiliers
11th Bn, Royal West Kent Regiment (Note: The Lewisham Battalion)	23rd Bn, Middlesex Regiment (Note: The 2nd Football Battalion)	32nd Battalion, Royal Fusiliers
18th Bn, King's Royal Rifle Corps (Note: The Arts and Crafts Battalion)	20th Bn, Durham Light Infantry (Note: The Wearside Battalion)	21st Bn, King's Royal Rifle Corps (Note: The Yeomen Rifles Battalion)
Pioneers	19th Battalion, Middlesex Regiment (Note: The 2nd Public Works Battalion)	

==== Territorial divisions ====
46th (North Midland) Division (United Kingdom)	Major-General The Honourable Edward Montagu-Stuart-Wortley	
137th Brigade	138th Brigade	139th Brigade
1/5th Battalion, South Staffordshire Regiment	1/4th Battalion, Lincolnshire Regiment	1/5th Battalion, Sherwood Foresters
1/6th Battalion, South Staffordshire Regiment	1/5th Battalion, Lincolnshire Regiment	1/6th Battalion, Sherwood Foresters
1/5th Battalion, North Staffordshire Regiment	1/4th Battalion, Leicestershire Regiment	1/7th Battalion, Sherwood Foresters
1/6th Battalion, North Staffordshire Regiment	1/5th Battalion, Leicestershire Regiment	1/8th Battalion, Sherwood Foresters
Pioneers	1st Battalion, Monmouthshire Regiment	

47th (1/2nd London) Division (United Kingdom)	Major-General Sir Charles Barter (relieved) then Major-General George Gorringe	
140th Brigade	141st Brigade	142nd Brigade
1/6th Battalion, London Regiment (Note: City of London Regiment)	1/17th Battalion, London Regiment (Note: Poplar and Stepney Rifles Regiment)	1/21st Battalion, London Regiment (Note: 1st Surrey Rifles Regiment)
1/7th Battalion, London Regiment	1/18th Battalion, London Regiment (Note: London Irish Rifles Regiment)	1/22nd Battalion, London Regiment (Note: The Queen's Regiment)
1/8th Battalion, London Regiment (Note: Post Office Rifles Regiment)	1/19th Battalion, London Regiment (Note: St. Pancras Regiment)	1/23rd Battalion, London Regiment
1/15th Battalion, London Regiment (Note: Civil Service Rifles Regiment)	1/20th Battalion, London Regiment (Note: Blackheath and Woolwich Regiment)	1/24th Battalion, London Regiment
Pioneers	1st Battalion, 4th Royal Welch Fusiliers	

48th (South Midland) Division (United Kingdom)	Major-General Robert Fanshawe	
143rd Brigade (Warwickshire)	144th Brigade (Gloucester and Worcester)	145th Brigade (South Midland)
1/5th Battalion, Royal Warwickshire Regiment	1/4th (City of Bristol) Battalion, Gloucestershire Regt.	1/5th Battalion, Gloucestershire Regt
1/6th Battalion, Royal Warwickshire Regiment	1/6th Battalion, Gloucestershire Regiment	1/4th Battalion, Oxfordshire & Buckinghamshire Lt. Inf.
1/7th Battalion, Royal Warwickshire Regiment	1/7th Battalion, Worcestershire Regiment	1/1st Battalion, Oxfordshire & Buckinghamshire Lt. Inf.
1/8th Battalion, Royal Warwickshire Regiment	1/8th Battalion, Worcestershire Regiment	1/4th Battalion, Royal Berkshire Regiment
Pioneers	1/5th (Cinque Ports) Battalion, Royal Sussex Regiment	

49th (West Riding) Division (United Kingdom)	Major-General Edward Perceval	
146th Brigade	147th Brigade	148th Brigade
1/5th Battalion, West Yorkshire Regiment	1/4th Battalion, Duke of Wellington's Regiment	1/4th Battalion, King's Own Yorkshire Light Infantry
1/6th Battalion, West Yorkshire Regiment	1/5th Battalion, Duke of Wellington's Regiment	1/5th Battalion, King's Own Yorkshire Light Infantry
1/7th Battalion, West Yorkshire Regiment	1/6th Battalion, Duke of Wellington's Regiment	1/4th Battalion, York & Lancaster Regt.
1/8th Battalion, West Yorkshire Regiment	1/7th Battalion, Duke of Wellington's Regiment	1/5th Battalion, York & Lancaster Regt.
Pioneers	3rd Battalion, Monmouthshire Regiment (replaced by 19th Bn. Lancashire Fusiliers 6 August 1916)	

50th (Northumbrian) Division (United Kingdom)	Major-General Sir Percival Wilkinson	
149th Brigade	150th Brigade	151st Brigade
1/4th Battalion, Northumberland Fusiliers	1/4th Battalion, East Yorkshire Regiment	1/6th Battalion, Durham Lt Inf
1/5th Battalion, Northumberland Fusiliers	1/4th Bn, Green Howards	1/8th Battalion, Durham Lt Inf
1/6th Battalion, Northumberland Fusiliers	1/5th Bn, Green Howards	1/9th Battalion, Durham Lt Inf
1/7th Battalion, Northumberland Fusiliers	1/5th Battalion, Durham Light Infantry	1/5th Battalion, Border Regiment
Pioneers	1/7th Battalion, Durham Light Infantry	

51st (Highland) Division (United Kingdom)	Major-General George Harper	
152nd (1st Highland) Brigade	153rd (2nd Highland) Brigade	154th (3rd Highland) Brigade
1/5th Battalion, Seaforth Highlanders (Note: The Sutherland and Caithness Battalion)	1/6th Battalion, Black Watch	1/4th Bn, Seaforth Highlanders (Note: The Ross Highland Battalion)
1/6th Battalion, Seaforth Highlanders (Note: The Morayshire Battalion)	1/7th Battalion, Black Watch (Note: The Fife Battalion)	1/4th Bn, Gordon Highlanders
1/8th Battalion, Argyll & Sutherland Highlanders (Note: The Argyllshire Battalion)	1/5th Battalion, Gordon Highlanders (Note: The Buchan and Formartine Battalion)	1/9th Bn, Royal Scots (Note: The Highlanders Battalion)
1/6th Battalion, Gordon Highlanders (Note: The Banff and Donside Battalion)	1/7th Battalion, Gordon Highlanders (Note: The Deeside Highland Battalion)	1/7th Bn, the Argyll & Sutherland Highlanders
Pioneers		

55th (West Lancashire) Division (United Kingdom)	Major-General Hugh Jeudwine	
164th (North Lancashire) Brigade	165th (Liverpool) Brigade	166th (South Lancashire) Brigade
1/4th Battalion, King's Own Royal Regiment	1/5th Battalion, King's (Liverpool) Regiment	1/5th Battalion, King's Own Royal Lancaster Regt.
1/4th Battalion, Loyal North Lancashire Regiment	1/6th Battalion, King's Liverpool Regiment	1/10th Battalion, King's (Liverpool) Regt.
1/8th (Irish) Battalion, King's (Liverpool) Regiment	1/7th Battalion, King's Liverpool Regiment	1/5th Battalion, Prince of Wales's Volunteers
2/5th Battalion, Lancashire Fusiliers	1/9th Battalion, King's (Liverpool) Regiment	1/5th Battalion, Loyal North Lancashire Regiment
Pioneers	1/4th Battalion, Prince of Wales's Volunteers (South Lancashire Regiment)	

56th (1st London) Division (United Kingdom)	Major-General Charles Hull	
167th Brigade	168th Brigade	169th Brigade
1/1st Battalion, London Regiment	1/4th Battalion, London Regiment	1/2nd Battalion, London Regiment
1/3rd Battalion, London Regiment	1/12th (London Rangers) Battalion, London Regiment	1/5th (London Rifle Brigade) Battalion, London Regiment
1/7th Battalion, Middlesex Regiment	1/13th (Kensington) Battalion, London Regiment	1/9th (Queen's Victoria Rifles) Battalion, London Regiment
1/8th Battalion, Middlesex Regiment	1/14th (London Scottish) Battalion, London Regiment	1/16th (Queen's Westminster Rifles) Battalion, London Regiment
Pioneers	1/5th Battalion, Cheshire Regiment	

==== Dominion divisions ====
2nd Indian Cavalry Division (India)	Major-General Henry Macandrew	
5th (Mhow) Cavalry Brigade	3rd (Ambala) Cavalry Brigade	9th (Secunderabad) Cavalry Brigade
6th (Inniskilling) Dragoons	13th Hussars	7th (Princess Royal's) Dragoon Guards
2nd Lancers (Gardner's Horse)	3rd Skinner's Horse	20th Deccan Horse
38th King George's Own Central India Horse	18th King George's Own Lancers	34th Prince Albert Victor's Own Poona Horse

Canadian Cavalry Brigade (Canada)	(attached to 2nd Indian Cavalry Division)	
Royal Canadian Dragoons	Lord Strathcona's Horse	Fort Garry Horse
Canadian Cavalry Brigade Machine Gun Squadron		

New Zealand Division (Note: The New Zealand Division later joined II ANZAC Corps together with the 3rd and 5th Australian Divisions)	Major-General Andrew Russell	
1st New Zealand Brigade	2nd New Zealand Brigade	3rd New Zealand Rifle Brigade
1st Battalion, Auckland Regiment	2nd Battalion, Auckland Regiment	1st Battalion, NZ Rifle Brigade
1st Battalion, Canterbury Regiment	2nd Battalion, Canterbury Regiment	2nd Battalion, NZ Rifle Brigade
1st Battalion, Otago Regiment	2nd Battalion, Otago Regiment	3rd Battalion, NZ Rifle Brigade
1st Battalion, Wellington Regiment	2nd Battalion, Wellington Regiment	4th Battalion, NZ Rifle Brigade
Pioneers	New Zealand Pioneer Battalion	

1st Canadian Division (Canada)	Major General Arthur Currie	
1st Brigade	2nd Brigade	3rd Brigade
1st Battalion (Ontario)	5th Battalion (Western Cavalry)	13th Battalion (Royal Highlanders)
2nd Battalion (East Ontario)	7th Battalion (1st British Columbia)	14th Battalion (Royal Montreal)
3rd Battalion (Toronto)	8th Battalion (90th Rifles)	15th Battalion (48th Highlanders)
4th Battalion	10th Battalion	16th Battalion (Canadian Scottish)
Pioneers	1st Canadian Pioneer Battalion	

2nd Canadian Division (Canada)	Major General Richard Turner	
4th Brigade	5th Brigade	6th Brigade
18th (West Ontario) Battalion	22nd (Canadien-Français) Battalion	27th (City of Winnipeg) Battalion
19th (Central Ontario) Battalion	24th (Victoria Rifles) Battalion	28th (North West) Battalion
20th (Central Ontario) Battalion	25th (Nova Scotia Rifles) Battalion	29th (Vancouver) Battalion
21st (Eastern Ontario) Battalion	26th (New Brunswick) Battalion	31st (Alberta) Battalion
Pioneers	2nd Canadian Pioneer Battalion	

3rd Canadian Division (Canada)	Major General Louis Lipsett	
7th Brigade	8th Brigade	9th Brigade
Princess Patricia's Canadian Light Infantry	1st Battalion, Canadian Mounted Rifles	43rd (Cameron Highlanders) Battalion
Royal Canadian Regiment	2nd Battalion, Canadian Mounted Rifles	52nd (North Ontario) Battalion
42nd (Royal Highlanders) Battalion	4th Battalion, Canadian Mounted Rifles	58th (Central Ontario) Battalion
49th (Edmonton) Battalion	5th Battalion, Canadian Mounted Rifles	60th (Victoria Rifles) Battalion
Pioneers	3rd Canadian Pioneer Battalion	

4th Canadian Division (Canada)	Major General Sir David Watson	
10th Brigade	11th Brigade	12th Brigade
44th Battalion	54th (Kootenay) Battalion	38th (Ottawa) Battalion
46th (South Saskatchewan) Battalion	75th (Mississauga) Battalion	72nd (Seaforth Highlanders) Battalion
47th (British Columbia) Battalion	87th (Canadian Grenadier Guards) Battalion	73rd (Royal Highlanders) Battalion
50th (Calgary) Battalion	102nd Battalion	78th (Winnipeg Grenadiers) Battalion
Pioneers	67th Canadian Pioneer Battalion	

1st Australian Division (Australia)	Major General Harold Walker	
1st (New South Wales) Brigade	2nd (Victoria) Brigade	3rd Brigade
1st Battalion	5th Battalion	9th (Queensland) Battalion
2nd Battalion	6th Battalion	10th (South Australia) Battalion
3rd Battalion	7th Battalion	11th (West Australia) Battalion
4th Battalion	8th Battalion	12th (Tasmania, S and W Australia) Battalion
Pioneers	1st Australian Pioneer Battalion	

2nd Australian Division (Australia)	Major General James Legge	
5th (New South Wales) Brigade	6th (Victoria) Brigade	7th Brigade
17th Battalion	21st Battalion	25th (Queensland) Battalion
18th Battalion	22nd Battalion	26th (Queensland & Tasmania) Battalion
19th Battalion	23rd Battalion	27th (South Australia) Battalion
20th Battalion	24th Battalion	28th (West Australia) Battalion
Pioneers	2nd Australian Pioneer Battalion	

4th Australian Division (Australia)	Major General Sir Herbert Cox	
4th Brigade	12th Brigade	13th Brigade
13th (New South Wales) Battalion	45th (New South Wales) Battalion	49th (Queensland) Battalion
14th (Victoria) Battalion	46th (Victoria) Battalion	50th (South Australia & Tasmania) Battalion
15th (Queensland & Tasmania) Battalion	47th (Queensland & Tasmania) Battalion	51st (West Australia) Battalion
16th (South & West Australia) Battalion	48th (South & West Australia) Battalion	52nd (West & South Australia, Tasmania) Battalion
Pioneers	4th Australian Pioneer Battalion	

5th Australian Division (Australia)	Major-General The Honourable James McCay	
8th Brigade	14th (New South Wales) Brigade	15th (Victoria) Brigade
29th (Victoria) Battalion	53rd Battalion	57th Battalion
30th (New South Wales) Battalion	54th Battalion	58th Battalion
31st (Queensland & Victoria) Battalion	55th Battalion	59th Battalion
32nd (South & West Australia) Battalion	56th Battalion	60th Battalion
Pioneers	5th Australian Pioneer Battalion	

=== Royal Flying Corps ===
- No. 1 Squadron RFC
- No. 2 Squadron RFC
- No. 3 Squadron RFC
- No. 4 Squadron RFC
- No. 6 Squadron RFC
- No. 9 Squadron RFC
- No. 10 Squadron RFC
- No. 41 Squadron RFC
- No. 70 Squadron RFC

== French forces ==
A majority of the French Divisions were triangular divisions – comprising three regiments, with each regiment containing three battalions. During the Battle of Verdun, General Pétain had rotated the French Divisions through the battle – resulting in a large number of divisions entering the Battle of the Somme with experience.

=== Army and corps organisation ===
List of Army/Corps/Divisions involved taken from Organigramme des Grandes Batailles.

==== Army ====
- Northern Army Group (Groupe d'armées du Nord) Commander: General Ferdinand Foch
  - Sixth Army: Army Commander: General Marie Émile Fayolle
  - Tenth Army: Army Commander: General Joseph Alfred Micheler

==== Corps ====
- I Corps. Corps Commander: General Adolphe Guillaumat
- II Corps. Corps Commander: General Denis Auguste Duchêne
- V Corps. Corps Commander: General Antoine Baucheron de Boissoudy
- VI Corps. Corps Commander: General Marie Jean Auguste Paulinier
- VII Corps. Corps Commander: General Georges de Bazelaire
- IX Corps. Corps Commander: General Horace Fernand Achille Pentel
- XI Corps. Corps Commander: General Charles Mangin
- XX Corps. Corps Commander: Generals Georges Prosper Anne Claret de la Touche and Émile Alexis Mazillier
- XXI Corps. Corps Commander: General Paul Maistre
- XXX Corps. Corps Commander: General Paul Chrétien
- XXXII Corps. Corps Commander: Generals Henri Mathias Berthelot and Marie-Eugène Debeney
- XXXIII Corps. Corps Commander: General Alphonse Nudant
- XXXV Corps. Corps Commander: General Charles Jacquot
- I Colonial Corps. Corps Commander: General Pierre Berdoulat
- II Colonial Corps. Corps Commander: General Ernest Joseph Blondlat
- I Cavalry Corps. Corps Commander: General Louis Conneau
- II Cavalry Corps. Corps Commander: General Antoine de Mitry

(Note: A majority of the corps and divisions were transferred from other armies during the battle.)

==== Infantry divisions ====
- 1st Infantry Division
- 2nd Infantry Division
- 3rd Infantry Division
- 4th Infantry Division
- 10th Infantry Division
- 11th Infantry Division
- 12th Infantry Division
- 13th Infantry Division
- 14th Infantry division
- 17th Infantry Division
- 18th Infantry Division
- 20th Infantry Division
- 25th Infantry Division
- 26th Infantry Division
- 39th Infantry Division
- 41st Infantry Division
- 42nd Infantry Division
- 43rd Infantry Division
- 45th Infantry Division
- 46th Infantry Division
- 47th Infantry Division
- 48th Infantry Division
- 51st Infantry Division
- 53rd Infantry Division
- 56th Infantry Division
- 61st Infantry Division
- 62nd Infantry Division
- 66th Infantry Division
- 70th Infantry Division
- 72nd Infantry Division
- 77th Infantry Division
- 120th Infantry Division
- 121st Infantry Division
- 125th Infantry Division
- 127th Infantry Division
- 132nd Infantry Division
- 152nd Infantry Division
- 153rd Infantry Division
- Moroccan Infantry Division
- 2nd Colonial Infantry Division
- 3rd Colonial Infantry Division
- 10th Colonial Infantry Division
- 15th Colonial Infantry Division
- 16th Colonial Infantry Division

==== Cavalry divisions ====
- 1st Cavalry Division
- 2nd Cavalry Division
- 3rd Cavalry Division
- 4th Cavalry Division

== German: 2nd Army ==
German order of battle derived from Hart, Appendix C unless stated.
Commander: General der Infanterie Fritz von Below On 19 July, split into the 1st Army (opposite the British) and the 2nd Army, Commander: General der Artillerie Max von Gallwitz (opposite the French) with authority over the 1st Army as Armeegruppe Gallwitz-Somme, this was not an army group, the term for which was Heeresgruppe
Chief of the German General Staff: General der Infanterie Erich Falkenhayn (until 28 August 1916), Generalfeldmarschall Paul von Hindenburg. German divisions were being converted from square to triangular, hence some had four infantry regiments, others had three.

=== Guards divisions ===
Guards Divisions
3rd Guards Infantry Division	Guards Fusiliers	Lehr Infantry Regiment	Grenadier Regiment No. 9
4th Guards Infantry Division	5th Foot Guards	5th Guards Grenadiers	93rd Reserve Infantry Regiment

=== Line divisions ===
Line divisions
5th Division	Grenadier Regiment 8	Grenadier Regiment No. 12	Regiment 52	
6th Division	Regiment 20	Regiment 24	Regiment 64	
7th Division	Regiment 26	Regiment 27	Regiment 165	
8th Division	Regiment 72	Regiment 93	Regiment 153	
12th Division	Regiment 23 (2nd Upper Silesian)	Regiment 62 (3rd Upper Silesian)	Regiment 63 (4th Upper Silesian)	
16th Division	Regiment 28	Regiment 29	Regiment 68	Regiment 69
24th Division	Regiment 133	Regiment 139	Regiment 179	
26th Division (Württemberg)	Grenadier Regiment 119	Regiment 121	Regiment 125	
27th Division	Regiment 120	Grenadier Regiment 123	Regiment 124	Regiment 127
35th Division	Regiment 141	Regiment 61	Regiment 176	
38th Division	Regiment 94	Regiment 95	Regiment 96	
40th Division	Regiment 104	Regiment 134	Regiment 181	
52nd Division	Regiment 66 (3rd Magdeburg)	Regiment 169 (8th Baden)	Regiment 170 (9th Baden)	
56th Division	Fusilier Regiment 35	Regiment 88	Regiment 118	
58th Division	Regiment 106	Regiment 107	Reserve Regiment 120	
111th Division	Fusilier Regiment 20	Regiment 76	Regiment 164	
117th Division	Regiment 157	Reserve Regiment 11	Reserve Regiment 22	
121st Division	Regiment 60	Reserve Regiment 7	Reserve Regiment 35	
183rd Division	Regiment 183	Regiment 184	Reserve Regiment 122	
185th Division	Regiment 185	Regiment 186	Regiment 190	
208th Division	Regiment 25	Regiment 185	Reserve Regiment 65	
222nd Division	Regiment 193	Regiment 397	Reserve Regiment 81	
223rd Division	Regiment 144	Regiment 173	Ersatz Regiment 29	
2nd Bavarian Division	Bavarian Regiment 12	Bavarian Regiment 15	Bavarian Regiment 20	
3rd Bavarian Division	Bavarian Regiment 17	Bavarian Regiment 18	Bavarian Regiment 23	
4th Bavarian Division	Bavarian Regiment 5	Bavarian Regiment 9	Bavarian Reserve Regiment 5	
5th Bavarian Division	Bavarian Regiment 7	Bavarian Regiment 14	Bavarian Regiment 19	Bavarian Regiment 21
6th Bavarian Division	Bavarian Regiment 6	Bavarian Regiment 10	Bavarian Regiment 11	Bavarian Regiment 13
10th Bavarian Division	Bavarian Regiment 16	Bavarian Reserve Regiment 6	Bavarian Reserve Regiment 8	
Marine Brigade	Marine Regiment 1	Marine Regiment 2	Marine Regiment 3	

=== Guards Reserve divisions ===
Guards Reserve divisions
1st Guards Reserve Division	Guards Reserve Regiment 1	Guards Reserve Regiment 2	Reserve Regiment 64	
2nd Guards Reserve Division	Reserve Regiment 15	Reserve Regiment 55	Reserve Regiment 77	Reserve Regiment 91

=== Reserve Infantry divisions ===
Reserve Infantry Divisions
7th Reserve Infantry Division	Reserve Regiment 36	Reserve Regiment 66	Reserve Regiment 72	
12th Reserve Infantry Division	Reserve Regiment 23	Reserve Regiment 38	Reserve Regiment 51	
17th Reserve Infantry Division	Regiment 162	Regiment 163	Reserve Regiment 75	Reserve Regiment 76
18th Reserve Infantry Division	Reserve Regiment 31	Reserve Regiment 84	Reserve Regiment 86	
19th Reserve Infantry Division	Reserve Regiment 73	Reserve Regiment 78	Reserve Regiment 79	Reserve Regiment 92
23rd Reserve Infantry Division	Reserve Grenadier Regiment 101	Reserve Regiment 101	Reserve Regiment 102	
24th Reserve Infantry Division	Reserve Regiment 101	Reserve Regiment 107	Reserve Regiment 133	
26th Reserve Infantry Division	Regiment 180 (10th Württemberg)	Reserve Regiment 99	Reserve Regiment 119 (1st Württemberg)	Reserve Regiment 121 (3rd Württemberg)
28th Reserve Infantry Division	Reserve Regiment 109	Reserve Regiment 110	Reserve Regiment 111	
45th Reserve Infantry Division	Reserve Regiment 210	Reserve Regiment 211	Reserve Regiment 212	
50th Reserve Infantry Division	Reserve Regiment 229	Reserve Regiment 230	Reserve Regiment 231	
51st Reserve Infantry Division	Reserve Regiment 233	Reserve Regiment 234	Reserve Regiment 235	Reserve Regiment 236
52nd Reserve Infantry Division	Reserve Regiment 238	Reserve Regiment 239	Reserve Regiment 240	
6th Bavarian Reserve Division	Bavarian Reserve Regiment 16	Bavarian Reserve Regiment 17	Bavarian Reserve Regiment 20	Bavarian Reserve Regiment 21
89th Reserve Brigade		Reserve Regiment 209	Reserve Regiment 213	

=== Ersatz divisions ===
Ersatz Divisions
4th Ersatz Division	Regiment 359	Regiment 360	Regiment 361	Regiment 362
5th Ersatz Division	Landwehr Regiment 73	Landwehr Regiment 74	Reserve Ersatz Regiment 3	
Bavarian Ersatz Division	Bavarian Reserve Regiment 14	Bavarian Reserve Regiment 15	Ersatz Regiment 28	

== Citations and references ==
=== References ===
Books

- Buchan, John (1992) [1920]. The History of the South African forces in France (litho repr. ed.). London: Imperial War Museum & Battery Press. ISBN 978-0-901627-89-6.
- Digby, Peter. K. (1993). Pyramids and Poppies: The 1st SA Infantry Brigade in Libya, France and Flanders: 1915–1919. Rivonia: Ashanti. ISBN 978-1-874800-53-8.
- Doughty, Robert A. (2005). Pyrrhic victory: French Strategy and Operation in the Great War. Cambridge, Massachusetts and London: Belknap Press. ISBN 978-0-674-01880-8.
- Hart, Peter (2006). The Somme. London: Cassell. ISBN 978-0-304-36735-1.
- Keegan, John (1998). The First World War (1st ed.). London: Random House. ISBN 978-0-09-180178-6.
- Kincaid-Smith, M. (2001) [1920]. The 25th Division in France and Flanders (pbk. repr. Naval & Military Press ed.). London: Harrison & Sons. ISBN 978-1-84342-123-8. Archived from the original on 20 December 2019.
- Liddle, P. H. (2001). The 1916 Battle of the Somme: A Reappraisal. Hertfordshire: Wordsworth. ISBN 978-1-84022-240-1 – via Archive foundation.
- Liddell-Hart, B. H. (1973) [1970]. History of the First World War (3rd ed.). London: Pan Books. ISBN 978-0-304-93653-3.
- Robertshaw, Andrew; Dennis, Peter (2006). Somme: 1 July 1916. Campaign 169. Oxford: Osprey. ISBN 978-1-84603-038-3.
- The Official Names of the Battles and Other Engagements Fought by the Military Forces of the British Empire during the Great War, 1914–1919, and the Third Afghan War, 1919: Report of the Battles Nomenclature Committee as Approved by The Army Council Presented to Parliament by Command of His Majesty. London: HMSO. 1921. OCLC 29078007.

Websites

- "Order Of Battle For The Somme July–November 1916". Western Front Association. Archived from the original on 2013-01-26.
- "Royal Naval Division (1914–1919)". The National Archives.
- "The 21st Division in 1914–1918". The Long, Long Trail. 1914–1918 Net.
- "The German Army: Order of Battle 1 July 1916". The Battle of the Somme 1916 [microsite]. Imperial War Museum. 2006. Archived from the original on 13 November 2014.
