= Capture of Beaumont-Hamel =

1916 action of World War I

- Part of the Battle of the Somme of the First World War
- Battle of the Somme, 1916
Date	1 July 1916; 13–18 November 1916
Location	Beaumont-Hamel, France 50°05′02″N 02°39′26″E
Result	German victory 1 July; British victory 13–18 November

Belligerents
British Empire: United Kingdom; Newfoundland	German Empire

Commanders and leaders
Douglas Haig; Henry Rawlinson; Hubert Gough	Fritz von Below

Strength
1 July: 29th Division; 13 November: 51st (Highland) Division	1 July: Reserve Infantry Regiment 119 (26th Reserve Division); 13 November: Infantry Regiment 62 (12th Division)

Casualties and losses
1 July: 5,240; 13 November: c. 2,200	1 July: 292
- Beaumont-Hamel, a commune in the Somme department, Picardy, northern France

The Capture of Beaumont-Hamel was a tactical incident that took place during the Battle of the Somme (1 July – 18 November 1916) in the Battle of the Ancre (13–18 November) during the second British attempt to take the village. Beaumont-Hamel is a commune in the Somme department of Picardy in northern France. The village had been attacked on 1 July, the First Day of the Somme. The German 2nd Army (General Fritz von Below) defeated the attack, inflicting many British and Newfoundland Regiment casualties.

On 1 July 1916, the 29th Division attacked at 7:20 a.m., ten minutes after a 40,000 lb (18,000 kg) mine under the Hawthorn Ridge Redoubt had been blown. The explosion alerted the Germans nearby, who occupied the far lip of the crater and pinned down British troops in no man's land on either side, where they were caught by German artillery-fire. White German signal rockets were mistaken for success flares and the 88th Brigade, including the Newfoundland Regiment, advanced from 200 yd (180 m) behind the British front line. The few parties that crossed no man's land found uncut wire. Reserve Infantry Regiment 119 had been in deep dugouts (minierte stollen) and emerged to defeat the attack. The Newfoundlanders suffered 710 casualties, of the 29th Division total of 5,240 casualties.

By early November, the British in the south were ready to attack northwards towards the Ancre river, simultaneous with an attack eastwards on the north side of the river to capture Beaumont-Hamel and Serre-lès-Puisieux. On 13 November, in thick fog, the 51st (Highland) Division outflanked Beaumont-Hamel on both sides and forced the garrison to surrender. Infantry and artillery co-operation was conspicuously superior to 1 July; barrages were better aimed and more destructive, cut off the German front line from the rear and neutralised German guns; mopping up parties had been given detailed objectives in the German defences. The German garrison was able to repulse an initial frontal attack but were surrounded in the fog and surrendered later in the day.

== Background ==
=== Beaumont-Hamel ===
The Ancre river flows west to Hamel then turns south through a valley past Miraumont, Grandcourt, Beaucourt-sur-l'Ancre and St Pierre Divion. On the north side of the river, the Auchonville Spur (with a lower feature called Hawthorn Ridge) and Beaucourt Spur, which descends from Colincamps and Grandcourt Spur, with the village of Serre-lès-Puisieux (Serre) on its summit to the north, point south-west down to the river. The Colincamps–Beaucourt Spur has a slight east–west rise, north of Beaumont-Hamel, which became known as Redan Ridge to the British. In the shallow valley between the Auchonvillers and Beaucourt spurs lies the village of Beaumont-Hamel and the road to Auchonvillers, with a branch known to the British from 1915 as Y Ravine, cutting into the south side of Hawthorn Ridge. Beaucourt Valley contains the road from Beaucourt to Puisieux, which lies to the south of Serre.

=== 1914 ===
The 26th (Württemberg) Reserve Division (Generalmajor Franz von Soden) of the XIV Reserve Corps (Generalleutnant Hermann von Stein to 29 October then Generalleutnant Georg Fuchs), arrived on the Somme in late September 1914, attempting to advance westwards towards Amiens. By 7 October the advance had ended and the troops occupied temporary scrapes. Fighting in the area from the Somme northwards to the Ancre subsided into minor line-straightening attacks. Underground warfare began and continued when the British Expeditionary Force (BEF) took over from the French Second Army at the end of July 1915. Miners brought from Germany late in 1914 tunnelled under Beaumont-Hamel and the vicinity to excavate shelters for the infantry, against which even heavy artillery could cause little damage.

== Prelude ==
=== British plan ===
The German front line ran northwards along the east side of Auchonvillers spur, round Y ravine to Hawthorn Ridge, across the Beaumont-Hamel valley to the Beaucourt spur and the Grandcourt spur, west of Serre. No man's land tapered from south to north from 500 to 200 yd (460 to 180 m) and was devoid of cover, except for a sunken lane north of the Auchonvillers–Beaumont-Hamel road. The German front line ran along small salients and re-entrants, with plenty of cover in the valleys behind and well-camouflaged dugouts and house cellars. Beaumont-Hamel had been fortified and from it, German machine-gunners commanded the valley in front; artillery-observers on Beaucourt ridge had a good view over the British lines; even the British field guns could be seen. From the British front line, only the German front and support trenches were visible down the slope; its convex nature obstructed British heavy artillery and much of it remained undamaged on 1 July. The 29th Division held the east side of the Auchonvillers spur, its right flank north-east of the Auhonvillers–Beaumont-Hamel road and the left flank close to the top of Beaumont-Hamel valley, next to the 4th Division.

The 29th Division was to advance 4,000 yd (2.3 mi; 3.7 km) eastwards across the Beaumont-Hamel valley to the German intermediate line on the Beaucourt spur, thence to the second position. The infantry had 3 1/2 hours for the advance and then Lewis gun teams were to form an outpost line. Because of the taper of no man's land, the leading waves were to stagger their departure to be 100 yd (91 m) from the German front trench by Zero-hour. The 18-pounder field guns were to make six lifts, starting from the German front trench at zero and lengthening their range by 50 yd (46 m) per minute. German machine-gun nests and shelters were to be destroyed by the divisional 4.5-inch howitzers. Two 18-pounder batteries were to be ready to move at short notice and the Royal Engineers were to wait behind the infantry to repair roads, build water points and consolidate strong points during the night. Three tunnels were dug forward on the 29th Division front and a mine with 40,000 lb (18 long tons; 18 t) was placed under Hawthorn Ridge redoubt opposite Beaumont-Hamel. After some argument, the timing of the mine detonation was set for ten minutes before zero-hour, to allow the British infantry to occupy the crater before the main attack began at 7:30 a.m. The barrage had to lift early all along the VIII Corps (Lieutenant-General Sir Aylmer Hunter-Weston) front, to avoid hitting the advanced parties at the crater.

=== German preparations ===
Many of the German units on the Somme had been there since 1914 and had made great efforts to fortify the defensive line, particularly with barbed-wire entanglements so that the front trench could be held with fewer troops. Railways, roads and waterways connected the battlefront to the Ruhr from where material for minierte Stollen (dugouts) 20–30 ft (6.1–9.1 m) underground for 25 men each had been excavated every 50 yd (46 m) and the front had been divided into Sperrfeuerstreifen (barrage sectors). Each officer was expected to know the batteries covering his section of the front line and the batteries had to be ready to engage fleeting targets. In 1915, a second position another 3,000 yd (1.7 mi; 2.7 km) back from the strongpoint line (Stützpunktlinie) was begun in February and was nearly complete on the Somme when the battle began. A telephone system was built with lines buried 6 ft (1.8 m) deep for 5 mi (8.0 km) to connect the front line to the artillery.

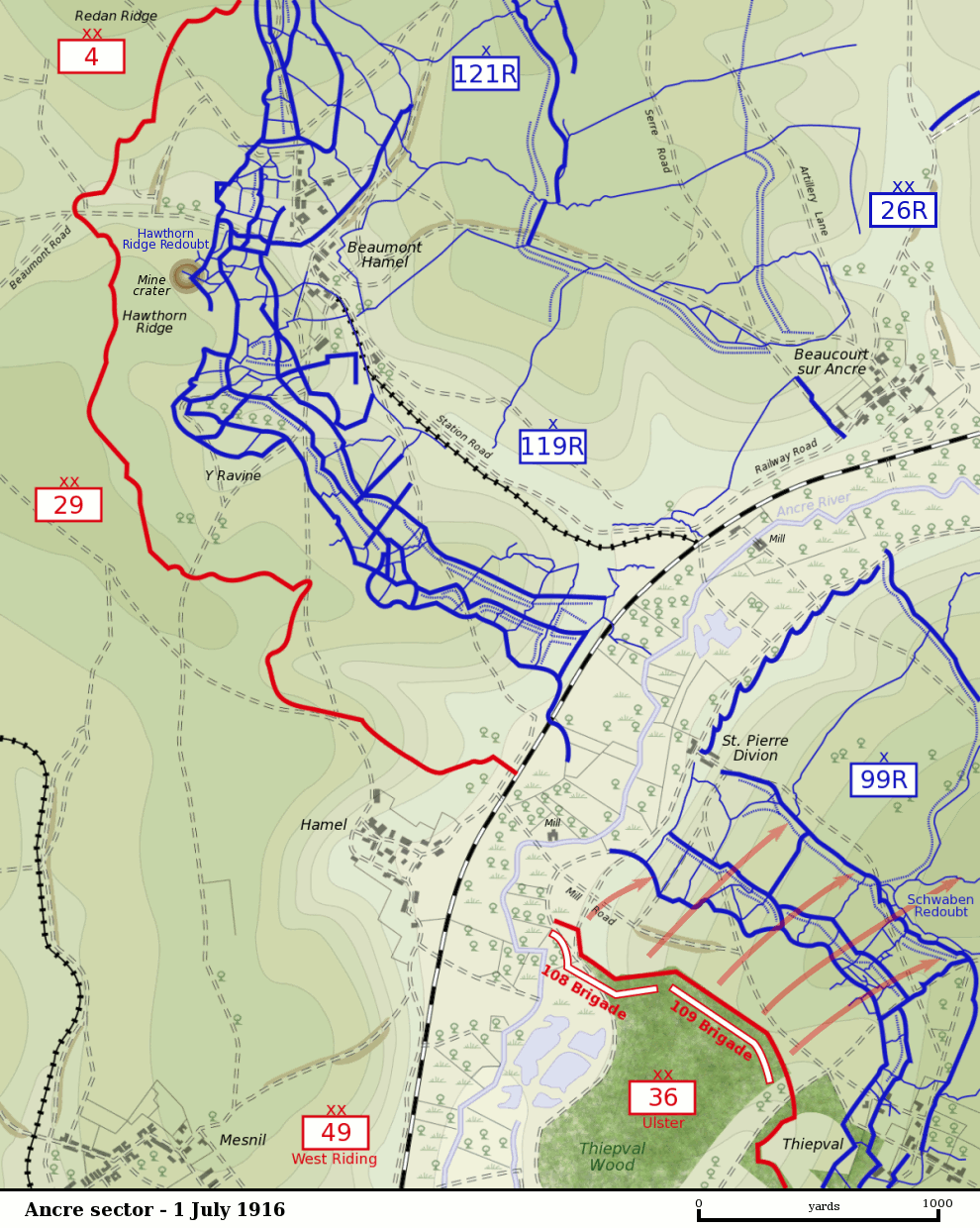
British and German front lines on the north side of the Ancre river

The trenches of the front position were on a forward slope, lined by white chalk from the subsoil and easily seen by ground observers. The defences were crowded towards the front trench, with a regiment having two battalions near the front-trench system and the reserve battalion divided between the Stützpunktlinie and the second position, all within 2,000 yd (1,800 m) of the front line, most of the troops being no more than 1,000 yd (910 m) from the front line, accommodated in the new deep dugouts. The concentration of troops so far forward and on the slope guaranteed that they would face the bulk of an artillery bombardment, directed by ground observers, on clearly marked lines. Digging and wiring of a new third position began in May; civilians were moved away and stocks of ammunition and hand-grenades were increased in the front-line.

By mid-June, Below and Rupprecht expected an attack on the 2nd Army, which held the front from north of Gommecourt south to Noyon, although Falkenhayn was more concerned about an offensive in Alsace-Lorraine and then an attack on the 6th Army, which held the front north of the 2nd Army from Gommecourt northwards to St Eloi near Ypres. In April, Falkenhayn had suggested a spoiling attack by the 6th Army but lack of troops and artillery, which were engaged in the offensive at Verdun, made it impractical. Some labour battalions and captured Russian heavy artillery were sent to the 2nd Army. Below proposed a preventive attack in May and then a reduced operation from Ovillers to St. Pierre Divion in June but only received another artillery regiment. On 6 June, Below reported that an offensive at Fricourt and Gommecourt had been indicated by air reconnaissance and that the south bank had been reinforced by the French, against whom the XVII Corps (Generalleutnants Günther von Pannewitz to 7 September then Paul Fleck) was overstretched, with twelve regiments holding 36 km (22 mi) and no reserves.

In mid-June, Falkenhayn deprecated an offensive on the Somme, since a great success would lead to operations in Belgium, rather than Germany. More railway activity, fresh digging and camp extensions around Albert, opposite the 2nd Army, was seen by German air observers on 9 and 11 June and spies reported an imminent offensive. On 24 June, a British prisoner spoke of a five-day bombardment to begin on 26 June and local units expected an attack within days. On 27 June, 14 balloons were visible, one for each British division but no reinforcements were sent to the area until 1 July and only then to the 6th Army, which was given control of the three divisions in reserve behind it. At Verdun on 24 June, Crown Prince Wilhelm was ordered to conserve troops, ammunition and equipment and further restrictions were imposed on 1 July, when two divisions were taken over by Falkenhayn. By 30 June, the 2nd Army had 129 aircraft in six Feldflieger-Abteilungen (reconnaissance flights: 42 aircraft), four Artillerieflieger-Abteilungen (artillery flights: 17 aeroplanes), Kampfgeschwader 1 (Bomber-Fighter Squadron 1: 43 aircraft), Kampfstaffel 32 (Bomber-Fighter Flight 32: 8 aeroplanes) and a Kampfeinsitzer-Kommando (single-seat fighter detachment: 19 aeroplanes).

== 1 July ==
=== 29th Division ===
==== 87th Brigade ====
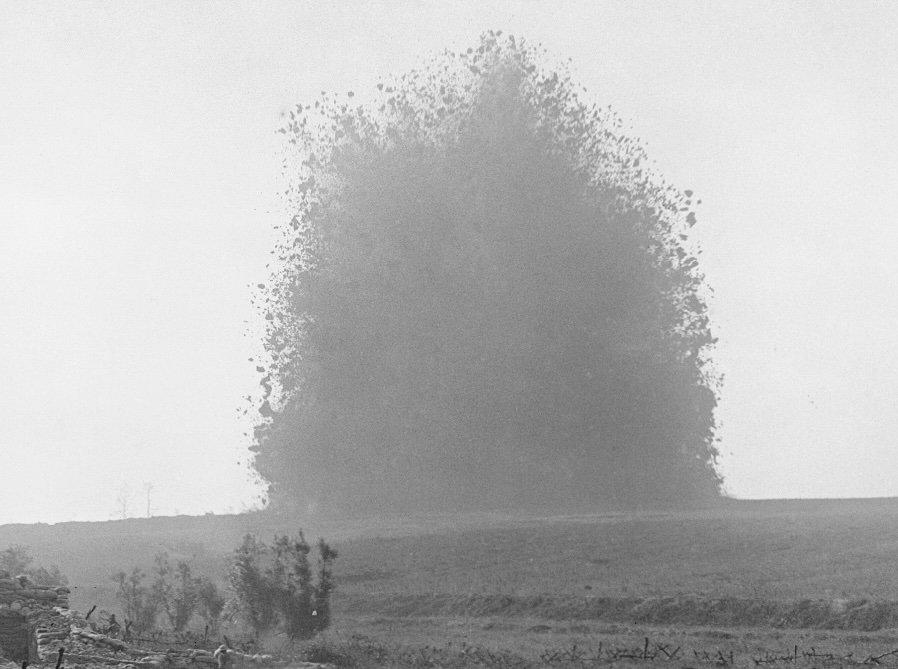
The explosion of the mine under Hawthorn Ridge Redoubt, 1 July 1916 (Photo 1 by Ernest Brooks)

The 87th Brigade (Brigadier-General C. H. T. Lucas) of the regular 29th Division attacked on the right, where the edge of Y Ravine was visible but the German wire and front line was mostly out of sight on the far side of a convex (outward curving) slope. The terrain followed the line of Beaumont-Hamel valley and the edge of the ravine, a re-entrant, from which the Germans could engage an attacker with cross-fire. (Note: Part of the attack was filmed and showed the detonation of the 40,000 lb (18 long tons; 18 t) mine beneath Hawthorn Ridge Redoubt at 7:20 a.m., ten minutes before the infantry attack began, which alerted the Germans.) The 1st Royal Inniskilling Fusiliers attacked to the right of Y Ravine, lost many men in the advance then found uncut wire; a few parties got through and were trapped. The 2nd South Wales Borderers attacked to the left of the ravine and were mostly stopped in no man's land; by 7:35 a.m. the battalion had been annihilated, apart from a few men lying in no man's land.

German artillery east of Beaucourt Ridge and heavy batteries beyond had commenced barrage fire (Sperrfeuer) on the British trenches soon after the advance began. The two battalions in support were devastated by the German guns as they moved forward to the front line. The battalions were to advance into no man's land at 8:05 a.m. but the fire of German machine-guns led both commanders asking for a pause to re-bombard the German lines; white flares fired by the Germans were mistaken for the British signal that the first objective had been taken and the attack went ahead. The infantry bunched at the lanes through the British wire and were cut down by machine-guns ranged on the gaps. The survivors trickled forward from shell-hole to shell-hole until forced to stop well short of the German line. The rigidity of the corps artillery plan meant that the barrage moved on, giving no assistance.

==== 86th Brigade ====
The 86th Brigade was to capture Beaumont-Hamel, out of sight at the bottom of the valley. German small-arms fire began as soon as the troops left the British trenches, five minutes before zero hour. The 2nd Royal Fusiliers on the right lost many men but a party of about forty veered to the left and joined those in the Hawthorn Redoubt crater; the few men who got into the German front line were killed. The 1st Lancashire Fusiliers on the left advanced with two companies forward, with a 100-man bombing party plus two machine-guns and four Stokes mortars, which had advanced along a sap to a sunken road in the middle of no man's land. The attack was halted short of the sunken road by German small-arms fire; when soldiers showed themselves, they were shot down and only about fifty men reached the low bank beyond. German guns had placed a barrage on the British lines as soon as the attack began and the trenches filled with walking wounded and stretcher cases, obstructing the move forward of the 1st Royal Dublin Fusiliers and the 16th Middlesex. The two battalions crossed the front line just before 8:00 a.m. and could see that much of the German wire was uncut and piled with British dead and wounded. The troops were swept by machine-gun fire from The Bergwerk on Beaucourt Ridge, just back from the north end of Beaumont-Hamel and cut down, apart from about 120 men of the 2nd Royal Fusiliers, who reached the Hawthorn Ridge crater; no troops reached the German front line. (Note: The mine, a maze of caves and passages left by the excavators of chalk for building, then used as refuges by local civilians in time of war.)

==== 88th Brigade ====
Exaggerated reports that troops of the 87th Brigade had been seen advancing down the valley to the German support line and that white success flares had been seen, led de Lisle to think that the attack on the right had broken through and that only a few machine-guns were temporarily holding up the supporting battalions. The 88th Brigade was ordered to move its two advanced battalions up behind the 87th Brigade, keeping the other two in reserve. The commander assembled the two battalions along the Hamel-Auchonvilliers road because the trenches were blocked, ready to attack on a 1,000 yd (910 m) front, between the right flank and the west end of Y Ravine. No artillery was available but a barrage was arranged with the 88th Machine-Gun Company and at 905 a.m. the Newfoundland Regiment on the left, advanced over open ground. The Newfoundlanders attacked from reserve trenches 200 yd (180 m) back from the British front line to avoid the congestion of dead and wounded in communication trenches.

The 1st Essex on the right was delayed by the congestion of dead and dying men. Many of the Newfoundlanders were hit German small-arms fire while still behind the front line but some got across no man's land near Y Ravine and into the front trench, where they were killed. The 1st Essex attacked as soon as it could and was bombarded by artillery from the right and machine-guns from the left as soon as the men emerged from cover; a few still managed to reach the German defences where they were killed. The remnants of both battalions were pinned down in no man's land. At 10:05 a.m., de Lisle received information about the disaster and he stopped the forward move of any more infantry and brought back the barrage from the fourth objective, at the far side of Beaumont-Hamel valley but only by 300–400 yd (270–370 m) since the positions of British troops were not certain.

==== Reserve Infantry Regiment 119 ====
In German accounts, much of the German wire on the front of the 26th Reserve Division had been cut, trenches obliterated, shelters and the buildings of Beaumont-Hamel had been demolished with so many shells that the craters overlapped. Troops of Reserve Infantry Regiment 119, sheltering under the village in deep-mined dugouts (Stollen), survived. With other units of the regiment at Leiling Schlucht (Y Ravine) and the Leiling and Bismarck dug-outs as far as the Ancre, the regiment engaged the British from the wreckage of their trenches as soon as they appeared on the far side of no man's land. More than three sections were blown up in the Hawthorn Mine detonation and the shelters of about 1 1/2 platoons collapsed, only about two sections getting out. A company in a large dugout were trapped when all four entrances were blown in, the troops being trapped until the British retreated. The situation at the crater was called "critical" and a two-platoon counter-attack worked forward from crater to crater and engaging in a bombing fight, which eventually forced back the British, except in the area of the Heidenkopf which was re-captured during the night. The regiment lost 101 men killed and 191 wounded.

== 13 November ==
=== 51st (Highland) Division ===
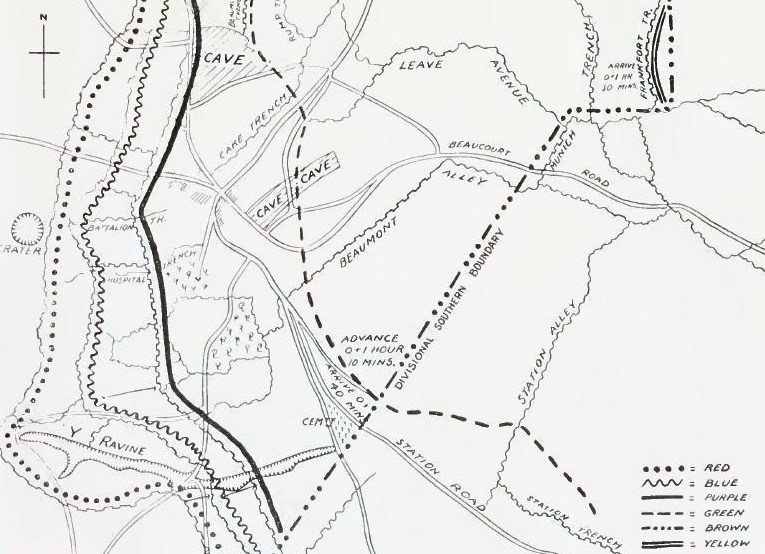
Objectives of the 51st (Highland) Division at Beaumont-Hamel, November 1916

A seven-day bombardment cut the wire on most of the attack front and destroyed many German defensive positions, except the Stollen deep below the villages near the front-line. On 13 November, a mist helped the British advance but many units lost the barrage as they struggled through mud. Both brigades of the 51st (Highland) Division attacked the first objective (green line) at Station Road and Beaumont-Hamel and then the final objective (yellow line) at Frankfort Trench with three battalions, while the fourth provided carrying parties. Six minutes before zero, the leading battalion of the right-flank brigade moved beyond the British wire and advanced when the new 30,000 lb (13 long tons; 14 t) mine at Hawthorn Crater was blown, passed the east end of Y Ravine and reached the first objective at 6:45 a.m., with a stray party from the 63rd (Royal Naval) Division. The brigade pushed on and then withdrew slightly to Station Road.

On the left, fire from Y Ravine held up the advance and at 7:00 a.m. another battalion reinforced the attack. Troops skirted the ravine to the north and early in the afternoon, a battalion from the reserve brigade, attacked Beaumont-Hamel from the south, joined by troops in the vicinity. The left-flank brigade was held up in places by uncut wire to the south of Hawthorn Crater and by massed machine-gun fire north of the Auchonvillers–Beaumont-Hamel road. Two tanks were sent up, one bogging between the German front and support lines and the other north of the village. Consolidation began and three battalions were withdrawn to the German reserve line and reinforced at 9:00 p.m., while one battalion formed a defensive flank to the south as the positions reached by the 63rd (Royal Naval) Division were unknown.

Weather (10–18 November 1916)
Date	Rain mm	Max–Min Temp (°F)	
10	0	50°–30°	–
11	0.1	55°–32°	mist rime
12	0.1	50°–48°	dull
13	0	54°–46°	fog
14	0	55°–36°	dull
15	0	46°–36°	–
16	0	46°–37°	fine cold
17	2	37°–25°	fine
18	8	54°–36°	–

The 51st (Highland) Division was supposed to have attacked at 6:20 a.m. as the 37th Division brigade, attached to the 63rd (Royal Naval) Division advanced. The orders were late and only strong patrols could be organised in time, which were forced back by the Germans. At 8:30 a.m. Munich Trench was occupied but at 11:00 a.m., British artillery began to bombard it, forcing the infantry out, to shelter in shell-holes. A company tried to bomb down Leave Avenue but failed; during the night the digging of New Munich Trench began, in ignorance of the German evacuation of Munich Trench. The 2nd Division attacked Munich Trench at 6:20 a.m. by advancing an hour before zero but suffered many casualties from an inaccurate British barrage. Many troops got lost in the mist and some strayed into Leave Avenue in the 51st (Highland) Division area, thinking that it was Munich Trench, where they were pinned down.

Units which reached Munich Trench were severely depleted and confusion reigned when some German troops wanted to surrender and others fought on. On the left flank, Lager Alley was crossed unrecognised because of the bombardment and the troops extended the British hold on Serre Trench. Troops withdrew from Munich Trench later in the morning to Wagon Road where they were joined by part of a reserve battalion. On the left flank of the attack, a battalion took over the defensive flank south of the Quadrilateral–Lager Alley, which was linked to the British trench by Cat Street tunnel. Believing that Munich Trench had been captured, two battalions were ordered to attack Frankfort Trench at 2:45 p.m. and were surprised by German machine-gun fire from Munich Trench; the survivors withdrew to Wagon Road.

=== Infantry Regiment 62 ===
Infantry Regiment 62 of the 12th Division moved forward to take over the defence of Beaumont-Hamel in early November via Schmidt Allee (Beaucourt Trench). The troops found that the dugouts were well made, the chalk walls and roofs needing no support and many being connected by tunnels. There were plenty of hand grenades but very few machine-guns, although those available had been dug into good positions with wide fields of fire. The front trench was found to be in fairly good repair but constant work was needed to keep it open, particularly in the small salient around Y Ravine, where British guns could bombard it from several directions. There were sandbag traverses every 33 ft (10 m) but high explosive shells frequently demolished them. Few German aircraft were to be seen, being outnumbered and outmatched but on one morning, the German troops were surprised to see a formation of 27 German aircraft fly towards the British lines. British aircraft appeared and shot down one of the aeroplanes and the rest turned tail.

British air superiority was demonstrated when heavy mortars were brought up to bombard the German lines. The mortar positions were identified in a sunken road and an artillery battery engaged them but before long, British artillery-observation aircraft located the battery and directed counter-battery fire onto it, silencing the guns. The Germans found that the communication between British artillery aircraft and the guns was excellent, the aircraft flying continuous sorties over the German positions and rear areas. If the aircraft received fire from the Germans the section of trench would be shelled extensively soon afterwards. The accuracy of British shelling of communication trenches, when successive shots landed along them, making it pointless to repair them was also ascribed to the communication between RFC aircraft and the British artillery. Delivery of food to the front line was interrupted and men had to subsist on dry bread. In early November there was continuous rain and trenches began to be washed into dugouts; it became impossible to stay dry. Boots began to rot and some soldiers became too chilled to speak.

On 12 November, the attack seemed imminent, as the British guns bombarded the front line and the trench garrisons sheltered underground, the air in the dugouts becoming foul. By the evening the trenches had been demolished and many of the dugout entrances blown in, the rest being kept open by constant digging. The British also fired gas shells, which caught out some of the German troops, the commander of the machine-gun company being killed. The suffering of the gas casualties added to the strain on the survivors, as they could not be evacuated through the shellfire. During the afternoon the rain stopped and in the night the bombardment suddenly stopped; everything went quiet. At dawn the German infantry formed up on dugout steps as they had become accustomed to by the sound of British preparations but the quiet continued and a thick mist rose. Trench sentries could see and hear nothing. Suddenly, supplies, food, ammunition and the unit mailbags arrived, the carriers having exploited the lull. The tension relaxed but the troops remained watchful and a sentry suddenly heard something, a rhythmic bumping of boots plodding through mud.

The Germans took post and waited for the machine-guns on the right flank to open fire but instead a huge explosion occurred under the machine-gun post and shrapnel shells and mortar bombs fell along the line of the front trench. A sentry in an advanced machine-gun post shouted "They're coming!" and a hand-grenade burst in the trench. The Germans rushed out of the dugouts throwing a hand-grenade each for cover as they took post on the fire step, part of the defence drill. The Germans opened fire with rifles and machine-guns into the fog and the British arrived in groups rather than skirmish lines (soldiers walked up to the trench with rifles slung, smoking cigarettes and one soldier already in the trench was captured). The Germans fired red and white SOS rockets for a counter-bombardment but these were invisible and the rest were thrown in front of the German defences to illuminate no man's land. Many British troops were shot down, some toppling into the trench and the rest retiring. The Germans held off the attack for two hours and then it faded away, the defenders having overcome deprivation, the extravagant number of shells available to the British, superior numbers and the RFC.

The garrison heard loud cheers from Beaumont-Hamel to their rear, which was taken to be the arrival of reinforcements and then a line of German soldiers was seen through the mist, with British troops around them. The mist thinned somewhat and the Germans saw lines of British troops advancing on the right through the positions of 1 Company. The garrison formed a defensive flank to the right and opened fire, causing many casualties; some British parties turned towards the Germans and were shot down, apparently unaware that the area had not been overrun. The British replied with machine-gun fire and forced the Germans back under cover, thinking that reinforcements had arrived and were working forward, ignorant of the positions of German troops who had not been overrun. Another machine-gun enfiladed the trench from the right and a figure emerged from the mist to the rear. The man was a German officer who announced that he was a prisoner and that the British were in the support and reserve trenches and Beaumont-Hamel. The Germans were short of ammunition and after a discussion the officers decided to surrender. A British party began to bomb up the trench and 103 Germans were taken prisoner.

== Aftermath ==
=== July ===
By the end of 1 July, the 29th Division retained a footing in the Quadrilateral (Heidenkopf) north of Beaumont-Hamel but this was abandoned early on 2 July. The British bombardment had been dispersed over too large an area and counter-battery fire had failed to neutralise the German guns. The British barrage had moved forward too far too quickly and the German machine-gunners were able promptly to engage the attackers, who lost so many officers that the survivors became disorganised. The British battalions in support could not be stopped and troops who broke through the German front trench were isolated by German parties, who emerged behind them from undamaged dugouts (Stollen). The only surprise achieved was the effect of the German artillery and machine-guns; the disaster was made worse by the confusion which led to German flares being taken for the British signal for success. The 88th Brigade was ordered to attack and the lone advance of the 1st Newfoundland after the 1st Essex were delayed by the congestion of dead and dying in the trenches, led to the second worst battalion casualties of the day.

=== November ===
The preliminary bombardment lasted for seven days and was twice the weight of 1 July, cutting wire but having little effect on the Stollen. The British infantry hugged the creeping barrage and had an overhead machine-gun barrage to keep the Germans on the ridge east of Beaumont-Hamel under cover. The fog protected the British infantry from German return fire but also made it difficult to keep direction and the mud slowed the advance. The divisions north of the 51st (Highland) Division encountered uncut wire and were repulsed, except at the junction with the 2nd Division where the German first position was overrun. German machine-gunners in Beaumont-Hamel repulsed the frontal attack but the village was enveloped to the south and north, eventually to surrender later in the day. Infantry–artillery co-ordination was vastly superior to 1 July and was more destructive, cutting wire, demolishing German fortifications and isolating the German defenders from their supports. Mopping up captured ground was also more efficient and two platoons were set aside to capture two battalion HQs in the village which had been identified from captured documents. The synchronisation of infantry and artillery was still prone to breaking down, preventing a further advance and the British suffered many casualties but a significant success had been achieved.

In 2017, Jack Sheldon wrote that in the 12th Division area, many machine-guns available on 1 July had been transferred and the remainder had less effect because of the fog. The men of IR 62 were in very poor condition by 13 December, having been in the line since the end of October, in dreadful weather, in positions formerly of high quality but reduced to wreckage by the British preliminary bombardment and the mud. The companies of IR 62 had been down to 80–90 men when it went into the line and 172 casualties by 10 November further reduced its efficiency. One company was caught in a gas shoot on 12 November but was not relieved because there were no fresh troops available. Everyone had coughs and colds, stomach upsets and increasing thirst and hunger as supply parties found it impossible to move forward or remove casualties. A few days before the British attack the telephone lines were cut, trenches were obliterated and the British advance during the Battle of the Ancre Heights (1 October – 11 November) exposed the German defences from the Ancre to Y Ravine to enfilade fire from south of the river. The loss of the village was a German defeat but despite all its difficulties, IR 62 inflicted many casualties on the Highlanders.

=== Casualties ===
On 1 July, the 29th Division suffered 5,240 casualties. The Newfoundland Battalion suffered 710 casualties, a 91 per cent loss, that was second only to that of the 10th Battalion, West Yorkshire Regiment, which lost 733 casualties at Fricourt. Reserve Infantry Regiment 119 had 292 casualties. From 13 to 17 November, the 51st (Highland) Division suffered approximately 2,200 casualties.

=== Subsequent operations ===
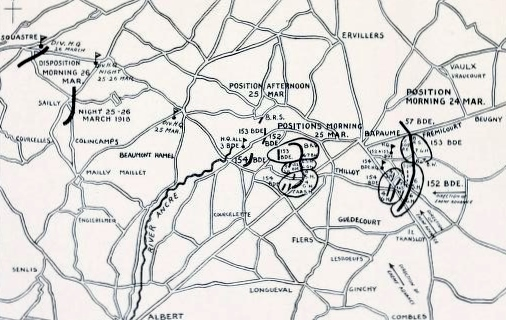
51st (Highland) Division retirement through Beaumont-Hamel 25 March 1918

At 10:00 a.m. on 25 March 1918, the 51st (Highland) Division was east of Beaumont-Hamel having been fighting since the beginning of the German spring offensive on 21 March. At 2:15 p.m. the division had to fall back to evade envelopment and later that afternoon, the division was ordered break contact and rally on Colincamps, where divisional HQ had opened at 4:35 p.m. The remnants of the division retreated along the Puisieux–Colincamps road, leaving Beaumont-Hamel undefended. The division had suffered 4,915 casualties since 21 March, the infantry losing 3,901 men. Around noon on 12 August, at the end of the Battle of Amiens (8–12 August) the German 17th Army retired on a 6 mi (9.7 km) front between the Ancre and Bucquoy, abandoning Beaumont-Hamel and Serre.

== See also ==
- Battle of the Somme: order of battle
