= Victoria Rifles of Canada =

- Regimental badge
- Active: 22 January 1862–5 March 1965
- Country: Canada
- Branch: Canadian Militia (1862–1940); Canadian Army (1940–1965)
- Type: Rifle regiment
- Role: Infantry
- Size: One battalion
- Part of: Non-Permanent Active Militia (1871–1940); Royal Canadian Infantry Corps (1942–1965)
- Garrison/HQ: Montreal, Quebec
- Nickname: The Vics
- Mottos: Pro aris et focis (Latin for 'for hearth and home')
- March: "Huntsmen's Chorus" and "Lützow's Wild Hunt"
- Engagements: Fenian Raids; South African War; First World War; Second World War
- Battle honours: See #Battle honours

The Victoria Rifles of Canada was an infantry regiment of the Non-Permanent Active Militia of the Canadian Militia and later the Canadian Army. First formed in Montreal, Canada East, in 1862, the regiment saw a service history stretching from the Fenian Raids of the 1860s–1870s into the middle of the 20th century. In 1965, the regiment was reduced to nil strength and transferred to the Supplementary Order of Battle.

The Victoria Rifles of Canada were based at the Cathcart Armoury, which houses the Régiment de Maisonneuve today.

== Lineage ==
=== Victoria Rifles of Canada ===
- Originated on 22 January 1862 in Montreal, Canada East, as The 3rd Battalion Volunteer Militia Rifles Canada.
- Redesignated on 18 July 1862 as the 3rd Battalion, The Victoria Volunteer Rifles of Montreal.
- Redesignated on 5 December 1879 as the 3rd Battalion Victoria Rifles of Canada.
- Redesignated on 8 May 1900 as the 3rd Regiment Victoria Rifles of Canada.
- Redesignated on 29 March 1920 as The Victoria Rifles of Canada.
- Redesignated on 15 November 1934 as Victoria Rifles of Canada.
- Redesignated on 7 November 1941 as the 2nd (Reserve) Battalion, Victoria Rifles of Canada.
- Redesignated on 1 June 1945 as the Victoria Rifles of Canada.
- Reduced to nil strength on 5 March 1965 and transferred to the Supplementary Order of Battle.

=== Lineage chart ===
Lineage chart

1862	The 3rd Bn Volunteer Militia Rifles Canada
1862	3rd Bn "The Victoria Volunteer Rifles of Montreal"
1879	3rd Bn "Victoria Rifles of Canada"
1900	3rd Regt "Victoria Rifles of Canada"
1914	24th Bn, CEF
1915	60th "Overseas" Bn, CEF
1917	244th "Overseas" Bn, CEF
1917	Absorbed by 5th Bn, CMR, and 87th "Overseas" Bn	Absorbed by 23rd Reserve Bn
1920	Disbanded	1st Bn (24th Bn, CEF), The Victoria Rifles of Canada	2nd Bn (60th Bn, CEF), (Note: Reserve) The Victoria Rifles of Canada	3rd Bn (244th Bn, CEF), The Victoria Rifles of Canada
1934	1st Bn (24th Bn, CEF), Victoria Rifles of Canada	2nd Bn (60th Bn, CEF), Victoria Rifles of Canada	3rd Bn (244th Bn, CEF), Victoria Rifles of Canada
1936	Victoria Rifles of Canada	Disbanded	Disbanded
1940	The Victoria Rifles of Canada, CASF
1941	1st Bn, The Victoria Rifles of Canada, CASF	2nd (Reserve) Bn, Victoria Rifles of Canada
1944	Disbanded
1945	Victoria Rifles of Canada
1951	"E" Coy, (Note: Regular Force) Victoria Rifles of Canada	"F" Coy, Victoria Rifles of Canada
1951	Absorbed by 1st Canadian Rifle Bn
1952	Absorbed by 2nd Canadian Rifle Bn
1965	Supplementary Order of Battle

== Perpetuations ==
The Victoria Rifles of Canada perpetuate the following units:

- 24th Battalion (Victoria Rifles), CEF
- 60th Battalion (Victoria Rifles of Canada), CEF
- 244th Battalion (Kitchener's Own), CEF

== Operational history ==
=== Fenian Raids ===
The battalion was called out on active service during the 1866 Fenian Raids from 8 March to 31 March 1866 and during the 1870 Fenian Raids from 24 May to 24 June 1870.

During the Fenian raids, the Victoria Rifles participated in the Campobello fiasco in Cornwall with other regiments like the Royal Scots. In 1866, several companies from the Victoria Rifles were sent to reinforce defences in St-Jean, Lachine, and Cornwall.

The raids of 1870 were the least effective of the Fenian attempts against Canada. The effort four years earlier at Campobello had the most far-reaching effects, as it induced New Brunswick and Nova Scotia to enter the Confederation. At the same time, operations in Canada East and Canada West brought about a martial spirit similar to that which swept the United States at the outbreak of the Civil War. Because the campaign was of short duration, there was no time for disenchantment. Yet the raids of 1866 were unfinished business, as the Brotherhood declared by warlike preparation.

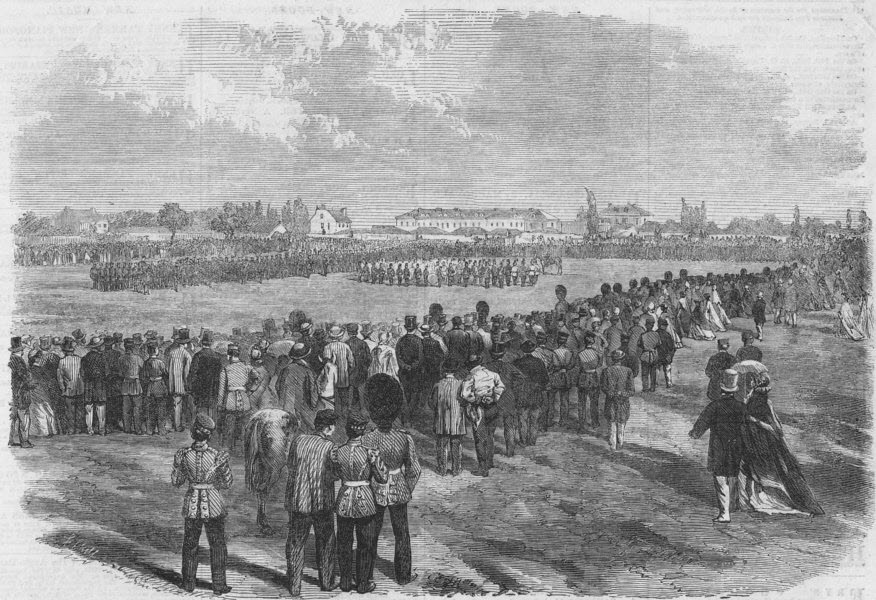
Presentation of Colours of Victoria Rifles of Canada in Montreal, 1862

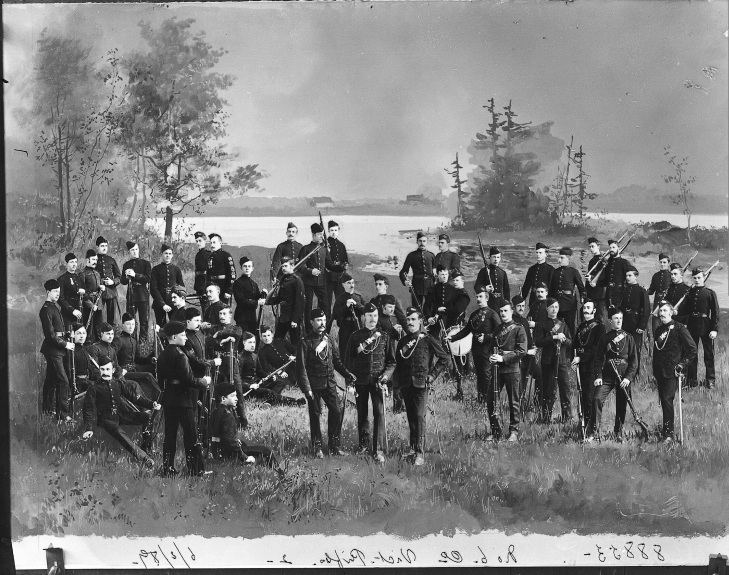
No. 6 Company, 3rd Victoria Rifles, 1889

=== South African War ===
The Victoria Rifles contributed volunteers for the Canadian contingents during the Boer War, mainly as part of the 2nd (Special Service) Battalion of The Royal Canadian Regiment.

Between 1885 and 1902, the Rifles were sometimes called upon to help quell civil disruptions in Montreal and Valleyfield.

=== Great War ===
During the Great War, details of the regiment were placed on active service on 6 August 1914 for local protection duties.

The 24th Battalion (Victoria Rifles), CEF, was authorized on 7 November 1914 and embarked for Great Britain on 11 May 1915. It arrived in France on 16 September 1915 and fought as part of the 5th Canadian Infantry Brigade, 2nd Canadian Division in France and Flanders until the war's end. The 24th Battalion was disbanded on 15 September 1920.

The 60th Battalion (Victoria Rifles of Canada), CEF, was authorized on 20 April 1915, embarked for Great Britain on 4 November 1915, and arrived in France on 21 February 1916, where it fought as part of the 9th Canadian Infantry Brigade, 3rd Canadian Division in France and Flanders until 30 April 1917, when its personnel were absorbed by the 5th Battalion, Canadian Mounted Rifles, CEF, and the 87th Battalion (Canadian Grenadier Guards), CEF. The battalion was disbanded on 15 August 1918.

The 244th Battalion (Kitchener's Own), CEF, was authorized on 15 July 1916 and embarked for Great Britain on 28 March 1917 where its personnel were absorbed by the 23rd Reserve Battalion, CEF, on 21 April 1917 to provide reinforcements for units of the Canadian Corps in the field. The battalion was disbanded on 15 Sept 1920.

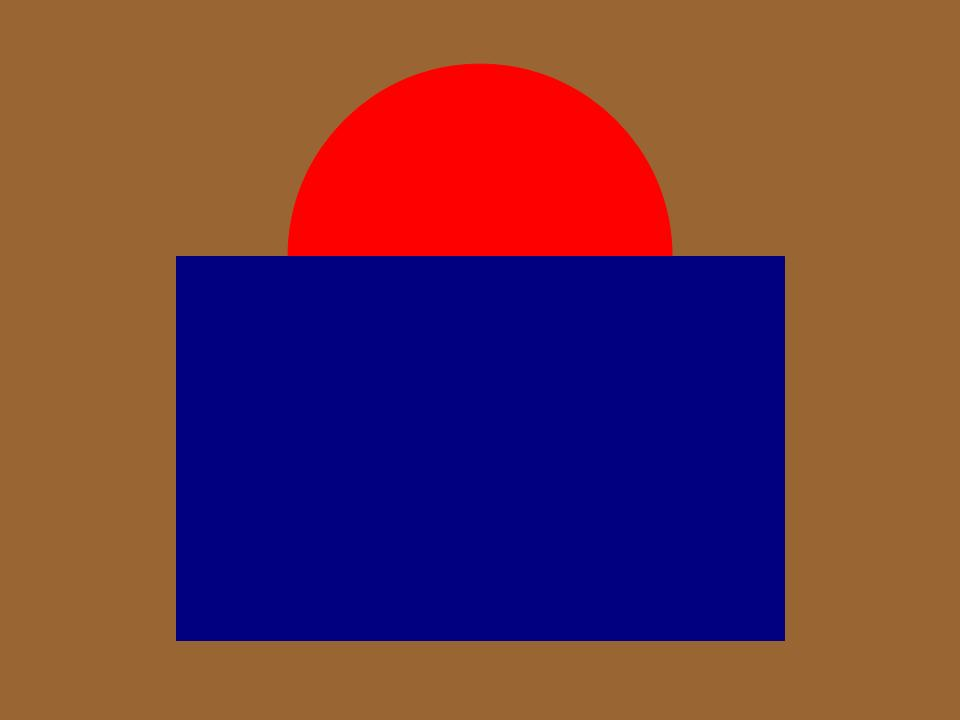
The distinguishing patch of the 24th Battalion (Victoria Rifles), CEF.

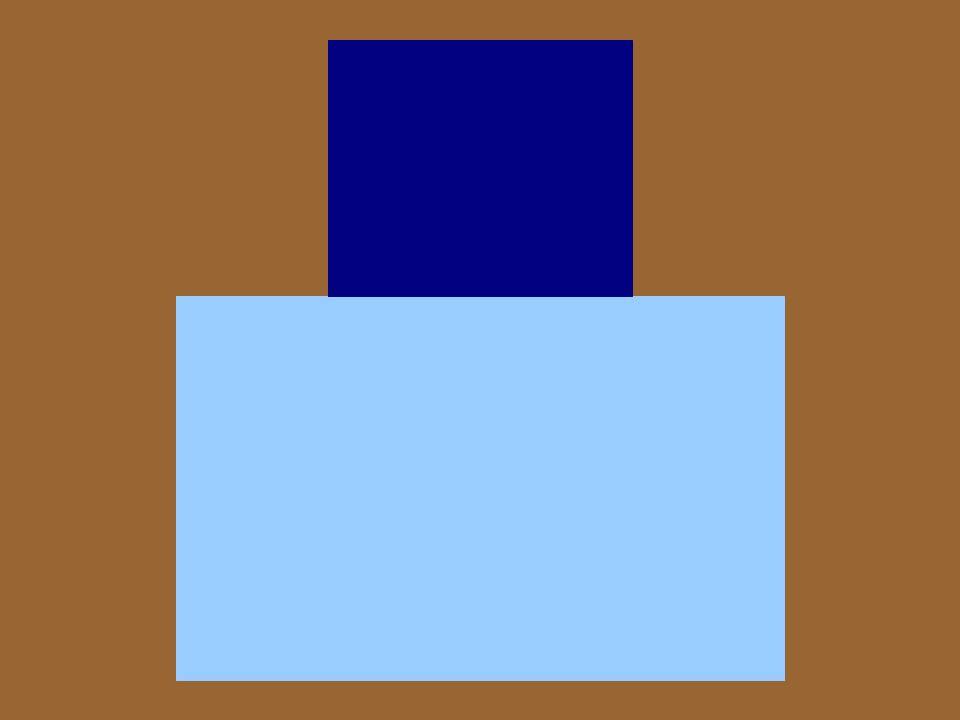
The distinguishing patch of the 60th Battalion (Victoria Rifles of Canada), CEF.

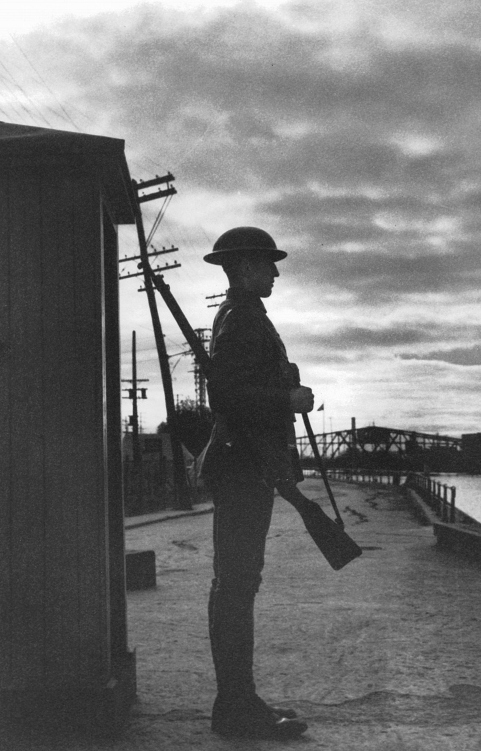
Soldier of the Victoria Rifles, guarding the Lachine Canal, Montreal, Quebec, Canada

=== Second World War ===
During the Second World War, the regiment was called out on service for local protection duties on 26 August 1939, and details of the regiment were also mobilized for active service under the designation Victoria Rifles of Canada, CASF (Details) on 1 September 1939. The details called out on active service were disbanded on 31 December 1940 and the regiment mobilized an active service unit designated as The Victoria Rifles of Canada, CASF, on 24 May 1940. It was redesignated as the 1st Battalion, The Victoria Rifles of Canada, CASF, on 7 November 1940. It served in Canada and Newfoundland from November 1940 to September 1941 on garrison duty as part of the 17th Infantry Brigade, 7th Canadian Division. The 1st Battalion embarked for Great Britain on 20 November 1944, and it was disbanded the next day, on 21 November 1944, to provide reinforcements to the Canadian Army in the field.

== Organization ==
=== 3rd Battalion Volunteer Militia Rifles Canada (22 January 1862) ===
- Regimental Headquarters (Montreal)
- No. 1 Company (Montreal) (first raised on 10 January 1862 as the 1st Rifle Company of Montreal)
- No. 2 Company (Montreal) (first raised on 10 January 1862 as the 2nd Rifle Company of Montreal)
- No. 3 Company (Montreal) (first raised on 10 January 1862 as the 3rd Rifle Company of Montreal)
- No. 4 Company (Montreal) (first raised on 28 February 1862 as the 4th Rifle Company of Montreal)
- No. 5 Company (Montreal) (first raised on 28 February 1862 as the 5th Rifle Company of Montreal)
- No. 6 Company (Montreal) (first raised on 28 February 1862 as the 6th Rifle Company of Montreal)

=== 3rd Regiment Victoria Rifles of Canada (15 December 1914) ===
- Regimental Headquarters (Montreal)
- A Company (Montreal)
- B Company (Montreal)
- C Company (Montreal)
- D Company (Montreal)

=== The Victoria Rifles of Canada (1 December 1920) ===
- 1st Battalion (perpetuating the 24th Battalion, CEF)
- 2nd Battalion (perpetuating the 60th Battalion, CEF)
- 3rd Battalion (perpetuating the 244th Battalion, CEF)

== Alliances ==
- United Kingdom - The King's Royal Rifle Corps (Until 1965)

== Battle honours ==
Those battle honours in bold type are emblazoned on the regimental unit appointments.

=== Fenian Raids ===
- **Eccles Hill**

=== South African War ===
- **South Africa, 1899–1900**

=== Great War ===
- **Ypres, 1915, '17**
- Festubert, 1915
- Mount Sorrel
- **Somme, 1916, '18**
- Flers-Courcelette
- Thiepval
- Ancre Heights
- **Arras, 1917, '18**
- **Vimy, 1917**
- Arleux
- Scarpe, 1917, '18
- **Hill 70**
- **Passchendaele**
- **Amiens**
- Hindenburg Line
- Canal du Nord
- **Cambrai, 1918**
- **Pursuit to Mons**
- **France and Flanders, 1916–18**

== Notable members ==
- Major General Charles Basil Price DSO DCM
- Lieutenant General Robert Moncel OC DSO OBE CD
- Lieutenant Colonel William Osborne Smith
