= 244th Battalion (Kitchener's Own), CEF =

The 244th (Kitchener's Own) Battalion, CEF was a unit in the Canadian Expeditionary Force during the First World War. Based in Montreal, Quebec, the unit began recruiting in the spring of 1916 in Montreal and the surrounding district. After sailing to England in April 1917, the battalion was absorbed into the 23rd Reserve Battalion, CEF later that month.

The 244th (Kitchener's Own) Battalion, CEF had one Officer Commanding: Lieut-Col. F. M. McRobie.

The unit was called "Kitchener's Own" because the battalion was officially authorized the day after Lord Kitchener was killed when the warship he was travelling on struck a mine.

The 244th Battalion is perpetuated by the Victoria Rifles of Canada which is currently on the Supplementary Order of Battle.
