= 60th Battalion (Victoria Rifles of Canada), CEF =

Infantry battalion of the Canadian Expeditionary Force during World War I

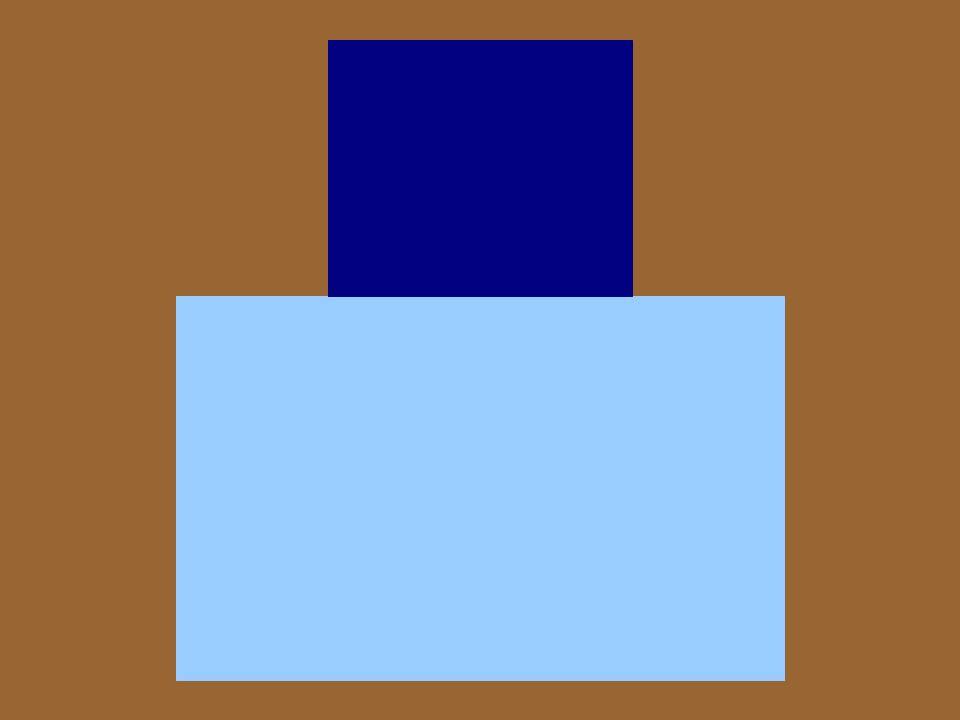
The distinguishing patch of the 60th Battalion (Victoria Rifles of Canada), CEF.

The 60th Battalion (Victoria Rifles of Canada), CEF was an infantry battalion of the Canadian Expeditionary Force during the Great War.

== History ==
The 60th Battalion was authorized on 20 April 1915 and embarked for Great Britain on 4 November 1915. It disembarked in France on 21 February 1916, where it fought as part of the 9th Infantry Brigade, 3rd Canadian Division in France and Flanders until 30 April 1917. It was replaced in the field by the 116th Battalion (Ontario County), CEF and its personnel were absorbed by the 5th Battalion, Canadian Mounted Rifles, CEF and the 87th Battalion (Canadian Grenadier Guards), CEF. The battalion was disbanded on 15 August 1918.

The 60th Battalion recruited in and was mobilized at Montreal.

The 60th Battalion was commanded by Lt.-Col. F.A. deL. Gascoigne from 6 November 1916 to 6 June 1917.

The 60th Battalion was awarded the following battle honours:

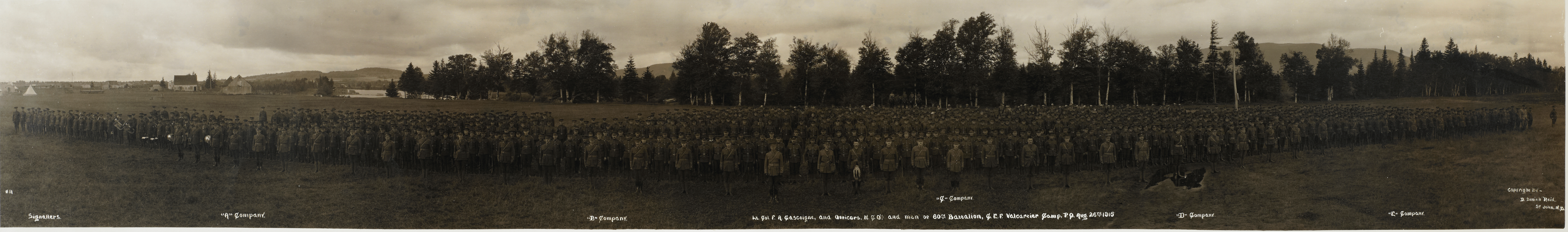
Lt.-Col. F.A. Gascoigne and officers, NCO's and men of 60th Battalion, CEF, Valcartier Camp, Aug. 26th, 1915. Signallers, companies 'A', 'B', 'C', 'D', 'E'. No. 11 (HS85-10-30759)

- MOUNT SORREL
- SOMME, 1916
- Flers-Courcelette
- Ancre Heights
- ARRAS, 1917
- Vimy, 1917
- FRANCE AND FLANDERS, 1916-17

== Perpetuation ==
The 60th Battalion, CEF is perpetuated by The Victoria Rifles of Canada, currently on the Supplementary Order of Battle.

== See also ==
- List of infantry battalions in the Canadian Expeditionary Force

== Sources ==
- Canadian Expeditionary Force 1914-1919 by Col. G.W.L. Nicholson, CD, Queen's Printer, Ottawa, Ontario, 1962
