= 24th Battalion (Victoria Rifles), CEF =

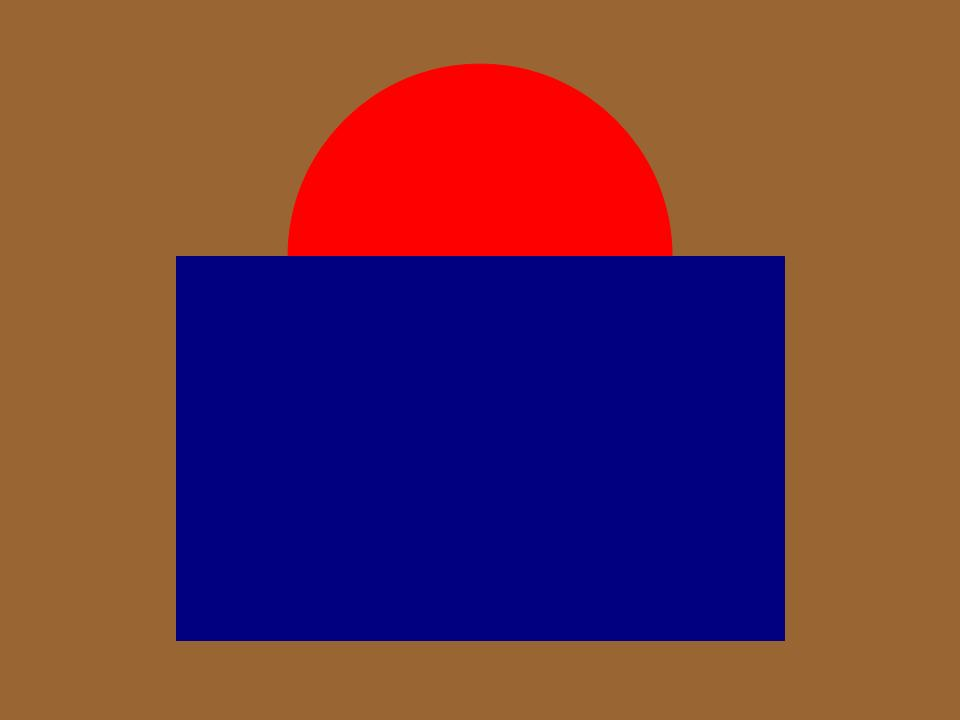
- The distinguishing patch of the 24th Battalion (Victoria Rifles), CEF.
- Active: 1914-1920
- Country: Canada
- Branch: Canadian Expeditionary Force
- Role: Infantry
- Size: battalion
- Engagements: First World War

The 24th Battalion (Victoria Rifles), CEF, was an infantry battalion of the Canadian Expeditionary Force during World War I.

== History ==
The 24th Battalion was authorized on 7 November 1914 and embarked for Great Britain on 11 May 1915, arriving in France on 16 September 1915, where it fought as part of the 5th Infantry Brigade, 2nd Canadian Division in France and Flanders until the end of the war. The 24th Battalion was disbanded on 15 September 1920.

The 24th Battalion recruited and was mobilized at Montreal, Quebec.

The 24th Battalion had seven Officers Commanding:

- Lt.-Col. J.A. Gunn, DSO, 11 May 1915 – 31 October 1916
- Lt.-Col. R.O. Alexander, DSO, 1 November 1916 – 7 December 1916
- Lt.-Col. C.F. Ritchie, 7 December 1916 – 14 April 1917
- Lt.-Col. R.O. Alexander, DSO, 14 April 1917 – 4 August 1917
- Lt.-Col. C.F. Ritchie, MC, 4 August 1917 – 22 January 1918
- Lt.-Col. W.H. Clark-Kennedy, VC, DSO, 22 January 1918 – 28 August 1918
- Lt.-Col. C.F. Ritchie, DSO, MC, 5 September 1918-Demobilization

One member of the 24th Battalion, Officer Commanding Lt.-Col. William Hew Clark-Kennedy, VC, CMG, DSO was awarded the Victoria Cross for his actions on 27 and 28 August on the Fresnes-Rouvroy line, France.

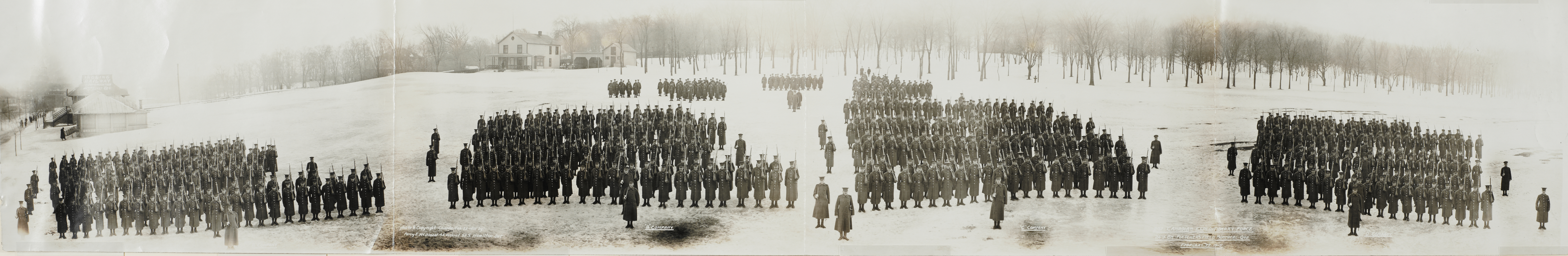
2nd Canadian Expeditionary Force 24th Battalion Montreal, Feb. 22, 1915. Arms sloped (HS85-10-30046)

== Perpetuation ==
The 24th Battalion (Victoria Rifles), CEF, is perpetuated by The Victoria Rifles of Canada, currently on the Supplementary Order of Battle.

== Battle honours ==
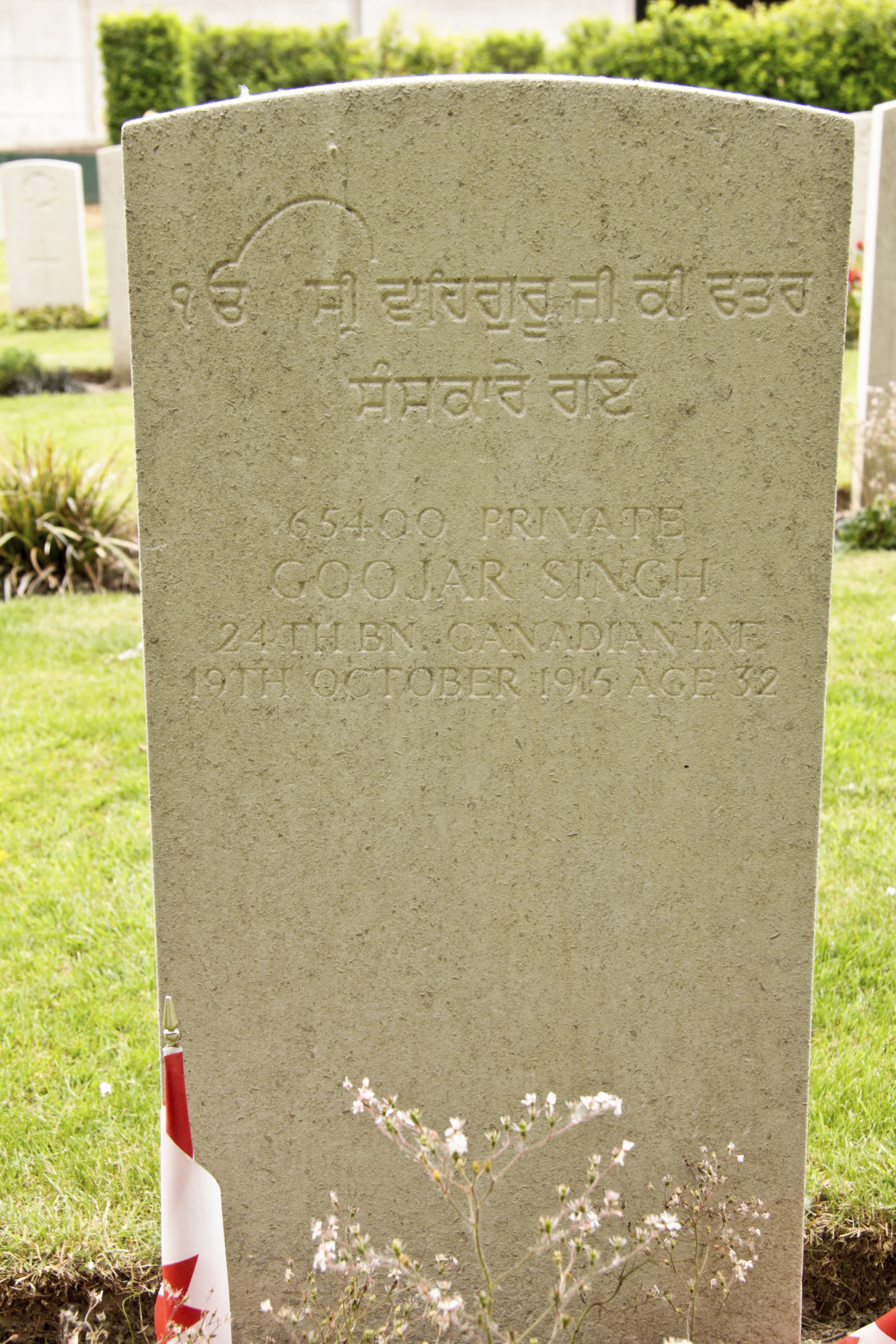
Gravestone of Goojar Singh, a Sikh buried at La Laiterie Military Cemetery in Kemmel, Heuvelland, Belgium.

The 24th Battalion was awarded the following battle honours:

- MOUNT SORREL
- SOMME, 1916, '18
- Flers-Courcelette
- Thiepval
- Ancre Heights
- ARRAS, 1917, '18
- Vimy, 1917
- Arleux
- Scarpe, 1917, '18
- HILL 70
- Ypres 1917
- Passchendaele
- AMIENS
- HINDENBURG LINE
- Canal du Nord
- Cambrai, 1918
- PURSUIT TO MONS
- FRANCE AND FLANDERS, 1915-18

== See also ==
- List of infantry battalions in the Canadian Expeditionary Force

== Sources ==
- Canadian Expeditionary Force 1914-1919 by Col. G.W.L. Nicholson, CD, Queen's Printer, Ottawa, Ontario, 1962
