= USS Ranger =

USS Ranger may refer to the following ships of the United States Navy:

- USS Ranger (1777) was an 18-gun ship sloop built in 1777 and commanded by John Paul Jones. She was captured by the British in 1780 and renamed HMS Halifax.
- USS Ranger (1814) was a schooner mounting a single 18-pounder gun, purchased in 1814 and sold in 1816.
- USS Ranger (Ontario) was a 14-gun brig also purchased in 1814 for operations on Lake Ontario, and sold in 1821.
- USS Ranger (1876) was an iron vessel mounting four guns, commissioned in 1876, converted to a nautical school ship in 1908, and broken up in 1940.
- USS Ranger (SP-237), was a steel yacht commissioned in 1917 and decommissioned in 1919, subsequently serving in the Department of Commerce from 1919 to 1930 before being returned to the Navy and sold in 1931.
- USS Ranger (SP-369), was a minesweeper built in 1882 and commissioned in 1918, and used in coastal defense until returned to her owner in 1919.
- Ranger (CC-5) was a Lexington-class battlecruiser renamed Constitution on 10 December 1917 and laid down in 1921, but canceled in 1923 and scrapped prior to completion.
- Ranger (CC-4), was a Lexington-class battlecruiser laid down in 1921, but canceled in 1923 and scrapped prior to completion.
- Ranger (1940), an ocean-going tugboat commandeered at Hong Kong by the U.S. Navy and assigned to the U.S. Navy Inshore Patrol before being lost in 1942.
- USS Ranger (CV-4), the first U.S. Navy ship originally designed to be an aircraft carrier, was commissioned in 1934, operated in the Atlantic during World War II, and was sold for scrapping in 1947.
- USS Ranger (CV-61) was an aircraft carrier, the largest in the world when launched in 1957.
- USV Ranger is an unmanned surface vehicle operated by the U.S. Navy as part of the Ghost Fleet Overlord drone ships.
