= Mariner (ship) =

Several ships have been named Mariner:

- Mariner (1804 ship) was launched at Whitehaven. In 1814 an American privateer captured her but the British Royal Navy recaptured her. On 23 August 1823 her crew abandoned Mariner, which then foundered in the Atlantic.
- Mariner (1807 ship) was launched at Whitby and registered in London. Her notability comes from her having made three voyages transporting convicts to New South Wales between 1816 and 1827. She continued trading until 1857.
- Mariner (1809 ship) was launched at Philadelphia. The British seized her for trading with the French and she became a British merchantman. She was wrecked in July 1823.

== See also ==
- HMS Mariner – one of five ships of the Royal Navy
- USS Mariner – one of two ships of the United States Navy
