= Sea Hunter =

Autonomous unmanned surface vehicle launched in 2016

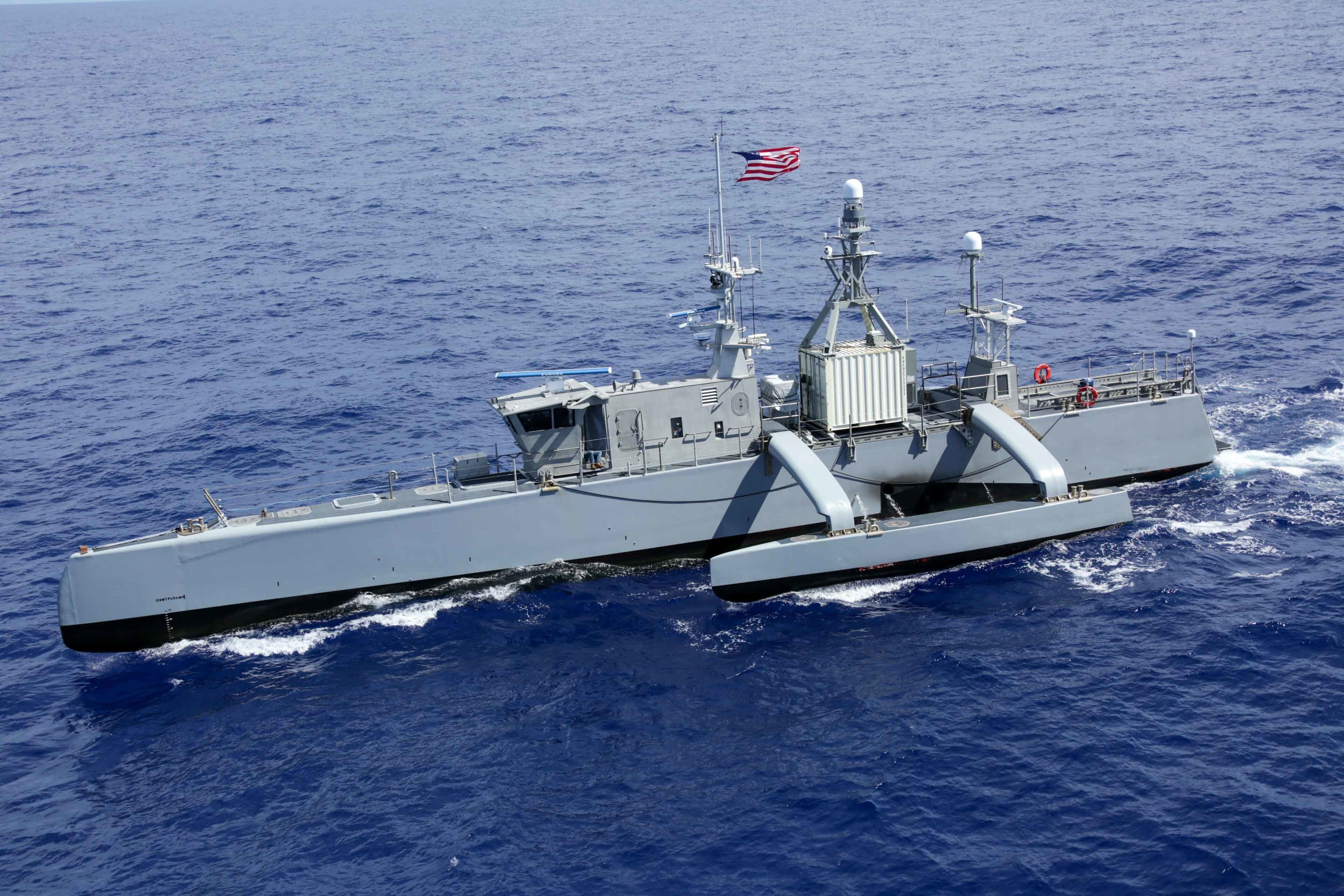
- Sea Hunter under way in RIMPAC 2022 exercises

History

United States
- Name: Sea Hunter
- Builder: Leidos; Christensen Shipyards; Vigor Industrial
- Acquired: April 2016
- Identification: MMSI number: 369970970
- Status: in service

General characteristics
- Type: Unmanned surface vehicle
- Displacement: 135 tons (standard) 145 tons (full load)
- Length: 132 ft (40 m)
- Propulsion: 2x Diesel engines
- Speed: 27 knots (50 km/h; 31 mph)
- Range: 10,000 nautical miles (12,000 mi; 19,000 km)
- Endurance: 30–90 day without supply
- Complement: None
- Armament: None

Sea Hunter is an autonomous unmanned surface vehicle (USV) launched in 2016 as part of the DARPA Anti-Submarine Warfare Continuous Trail Unmanned Vessel (ACTUV) program. The ship was christened 7 April 2016 in Portland, Oregon. It was designed and built by Leidos, with manufacturing subcontracted to Christensen Shipyards (and later Vigor Industrial after Christensen went into receivership). The vessel continues the line of experimental "Sea" ships, including Sea Shadow, Sea Fighter, Sea Jet, and Sea Slice. Sea Hunter is classified as a Class III USV and designated the Medium Displacement Unmanned Surface Vehicle (MDUSV).

== Description ==
The initially unarmed prototype, built at a cost of $20 million, is a 132-foot (40 meter)-long trimaran (a central hull with two outriggers). It is an unmanned self-piloting craft with twin screws, powered by two diesel engines with a top speed of 27 knots (31 mph; 50 km/h). Her weight is 135 tons, including 40 tons of fuel, adequate for a 70-day cruise. Cruising range is "transoceanic," 10,000 nautical miles (12,000 mi; 19,000 km) at 12 knots (14 mph; 22 km/h) fully fueled with 14,000 U.S. gallons (53,000 L) of diesel, enough "to go from San Diego to Guam and back to Pearl Harbor on a tank of gas." Sea Hunter has a full load displacement of 145 tons and is intended to be operational through Sea State 5, waves up to 6.5 ft (2.0 m) high and winds up to 21 knots (24 mph; 39 km/h), and survivable through Sea State 7, seas up to 20 ft (6.1 m) high. The trimaran hull provides increased stability without requiring a weighted keel, giving her a higher capacity for linear trajectories and better operations in shallow waters, though the greater width decreases maneuverability.

A removable operator control station is installed during the testing period "for safety and backup" until it can be determined to reliably operate on her own. Operationally, computers will drive and control the ship, with a human always observing and taking charge if necessary in a concept called Sparse Supervisory Control, meaning a person is in control, but not "joy sticking" the vessel around. The system can patrol without human guidance, using optical guidance and radar to avoid hitting obstacles or other watercraft. The ship has a host of non-standard features because of her lack of crew, including an internal layout that offers enough room for maintenance to be performed but not for any people to be permanently present.

The craft is expected to undergo two years of testing before being placed in service with the U.S. Navy. If tests are successful, future craft of this type may be armed and used for anti-submarine and counter-mine duties, operating at a cost of $15,000–20,000 per day, a fraction of the cost of a destroyer at $700,000 per day (in 2015, equivalent to $950,793 in 2025); it could operate with Littoral Combat Ships, becoming an extension of the LCS ASW module. Deputy U.S. Defense Secretary Robert Work said that if weapons are added to the ship, a human would always remotely make the decision to use lethal force.

Following successful initial development, it was reported on 1 February 2018 that DARPA had handed development of Sea Hunter to the Office of Naval Research (ONR).

== Sea trials and operations ==
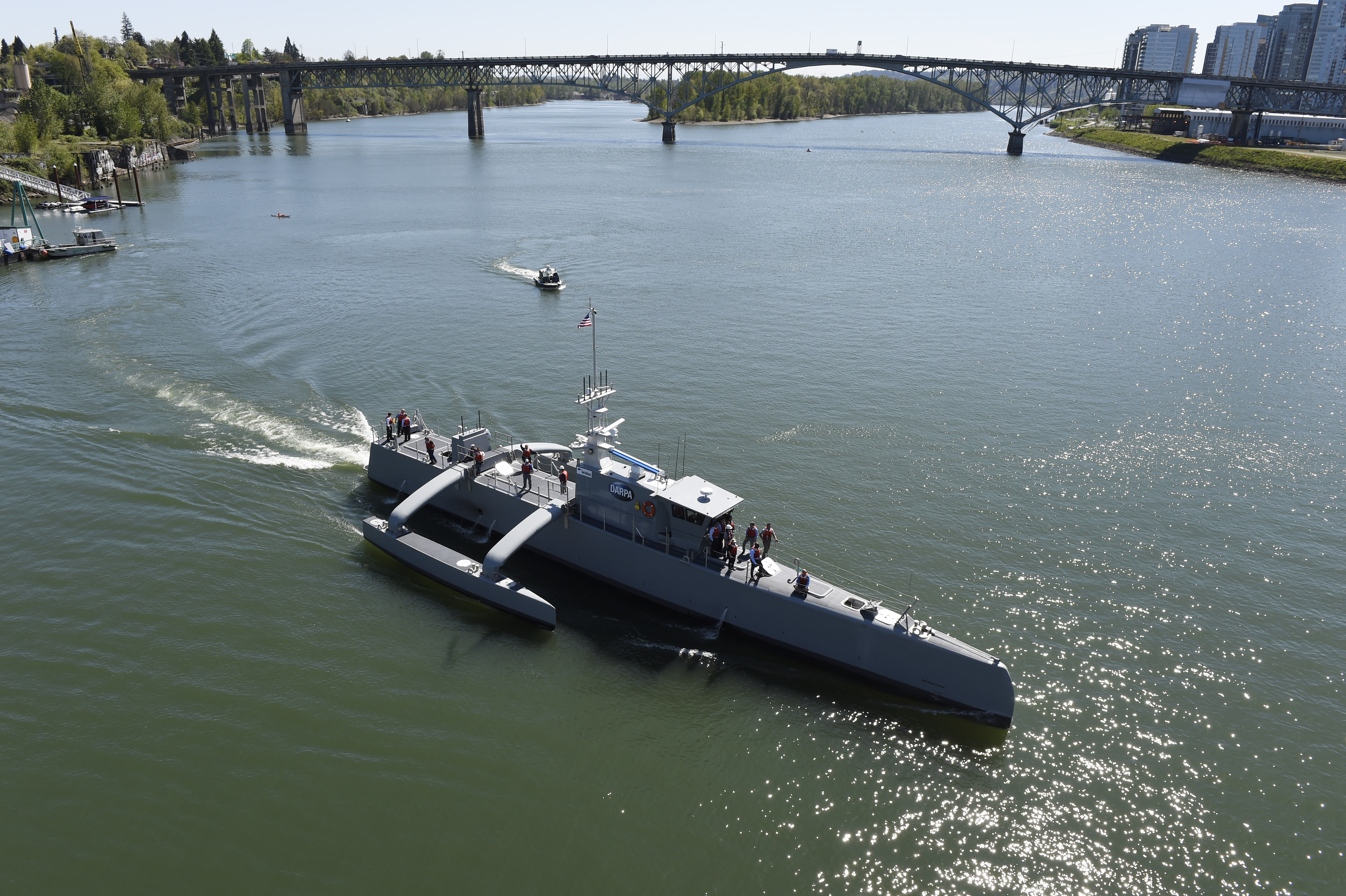
Sea Hunter gets underway on the Willamette River following a christening ceremony in Portland, Oregon, in April 2016

On 22 June 2016, Sea Hunter completed initial performance trials, meeting or surpassing all performance objectives for speed, maneuverability, stability, seakeeping, acceleration/deceleration, fuel consumption, and mechanical systems reliability in the open-ocean. Upcoming trials will include testing of sensors, the vessel's autonomy suite, compliance with maritime collision regulations, and proof-of-concept demonstrations for a variety of U.S. Navy missions. Sea Hunter was sent to the ONR in summer 2017 for operational testing and evaluation for mine-countermeasure, EO/IR, and submarine detection capabilities. Plans for FY 2018 include adding intelligence, surveillance and reconnaissance (ISR) and offensive anti-submarine payloads.

In August 2022, Sea Hunter and other unmanned vessels USV Nomad and USV Ranger (Ghost Fleet Overlord) participated in the Rim of the Pacific exercise (RIMPAC).

In 2026, Sea Hunter and USV Seahawk, both Sea Hunter-class USVs, of Surface Development Group One, would be deployed operationally by the U.S. Navy, as the first division of USVs.

== Other ships ==
It has been reported in 2020 and confirmed in 2024 that the People's Republic of China was building clones of Sea Hunter.

In 2021 a sister ship was built and named the USV Seahawk.

== See also ==
- JARI USV
