= USS Mariner =

USS Mariner may refer to the following ships of the United States Navy:

- USS Mariner (SP-1136), formerly the steam tugboat Jack T. Scully, was built in 1899 and delivered to the US Navy in 1917. She was lost at sea and stricken in 1918.
- USS Mariner (1906), a steam tug, was built in 1906, and taken over by the US Navy in 1918. She was returned to her owner and stricken in 1919.
- USV Mariner is an unmanned surface vehicle operated by the U.S. Navy as part of the Ghost Fleet Overlord drone ships.

== See also ==
- USAS American Mariner, a United States Army research vessel
