= JARI USV =

Chinese drone boat

Class overview
- Name: JARI USV
- Builders: China Shipbuilding Industry Corporation
- Built: Before 2018
- Completed: 1 (prototype)
- Active: 1 (prototype)

General characteristics
- Type: Uncrewed surface vehicle
- Displacement: 420-500 tons
- Length: 58 m (190.3 ft)
- Beam: 23 m (75.5 ft)
- Draft: 1.8 m (5.9 ft)
- Propulsion: 1 × water jet
- Speed: 42 knots (max)
- Range: 4,000 nmi (7,400 km)
- Sensors & processing systems: Active phased array radar; Electro-optic system; Navigation radar; Satellite link antenna; Sonar (optional)
- Armament: 1 × 30 mm remote weapon station; 8 × VLS; Surface-to-air missiles; Anti-ship missiles; 2 × rocket pods (optional); Total of 4 × guided or unguided rockets; 2 × single torpedo launchers (optional); Lightweight torpedoes

The JARI USV, also known as the Orca, is an uncrewed surface vehicle developed by the China Shipbuilding Industry Corporation (CSIC), specifically between its No. 716 Research Institute, the Jiangsu Automation Research Institute (JARI), and No. 702 Research Institute, China Ship Scientific Research Centre (CSRRC). The uncrewed warship is designed for potential use by the People's Liberation Army Navy and export customers.

== Development ==
It is unknown when or how long the Orca USV was built. A mockup model of the JARI USV was first unveiled by China Shipbuilding and Offshore International Company (CSOC), the export arm of CSIC, at Africa Aerospace and Defence Expo (ADD) in September 2018. However, a CSOC representative stated that a working prototype had already been produced and started sea trials earlier in the same year.

On August 21, 2019, CSIC launched the Orca USV at an undisclosed location, declaring it to have achieved initial combat capabilities. The announcement also revealed that the vessel was jointly developed by CSIC's research institutes No. 716 and No. 702. CSIC announced it would further test the JARI USV to achieve full autonomous capability. In late December 2019, images of the drone undergoing sea trials began to circulate on Twitter. The sea trial was later confirmed by Ordnance Industry Science Technology, a Chinese magazine that covers national defense technologies, in mid-January 2020.

== Design ==
The USV is 58 m in length, 23 m wide, 4 meters deep, and has a displacement of about 420-500 tons. It has a range of 4000 nautical miles and can achieve a maximum speed of 42 knots. Its propulsion consists of a single pump-jet. The hull is a trimaran design.

The vessel has four fixed panels of active phased array radar (APAR) to give it a 360-degree radar coverage. Electro-optic systems are placed on top of the superstructure to look for its targets. Navigational radar and satellite link antenna aid the vessel in its operation in open water. The JARI USV can optionally be fitted with a sonar for anti-submarine warfare (ASW).

The vessel's "main gun" is a 30 mm remote controlled weapon station that can be optionally fitted with two rocket pods, each containing two guided or unguided rockets. Behind the main gun are two 2x2 vertical launching systems that can launch surface-to-air missiles and anti-ship missiles. Two single torpedo launchers can be fitted on the sides of the USV for ASW. Lightweight torpedoes, speculated to be the ET52 torpedo, are used for the launchers.

The JARI USV is described as a multipurpose, "medium-sized" unmanned surface vehicle. The drone possesses a modular design, allowing it to switch configurations and perform missions of a destroyer, such as air defense, anti-ship, and anti-submarine missions, but on a much smaller scale. Because of its design, radar, and weaponry, it has been called a "mini Aegis-class destroyer". While the drone can be operated remotely from land or a nearby mothership, it can also operate autonomously via an artificial intelligence. The JARI USV can operate alone or in a swarm once it's given its commands. According to Ordnance Industry Science Technology, the drone is envisioned to be deployed from an aircraft carrier or amphibious assault ship to provide China's carrier battle group with additional reconnaissance and firepower.

Chinese media have declared the JARI USV a "world-leading unmanned warship". Navy Recognition, an online naval defense news, also noted the maturity of its technologies due to its short timeframe between its launch and combat readiness. The US think tank Brookings Institution believes the JARI USV is part of the trend in China's advancement in weaponizing A.I. technology. There is, however, skepticism over the capabilities and technologies of the JARI USV. SOFREP, a military news site, expressed doubt over the drone's capabilities, noting that China has been known to declare weapon platforms "operational" before their development is finished and exaggerate its new technologies. Bryan Clark, a US defense expert and former naval officer, stated that the vessel's design is relatively ordinary and has yet to fully mature. He also stated the vessel lacks sufficient range for long range operations and would therefore be better suited to patrol closer to Chinese territories, i.e., islands in the South China Sea or ports. Seth Cropsey, an expert at the Hudson Institute, stated that while the JARI USV is a start for China's USV programs, it still lags behind USV programs of the US Navy.

== See also ==
- Ghost Fleet Overlord
- Sea Hunter
