= USS Ranger (CV-61) =

Forrestal-class aircraft carrier (1957–1993)

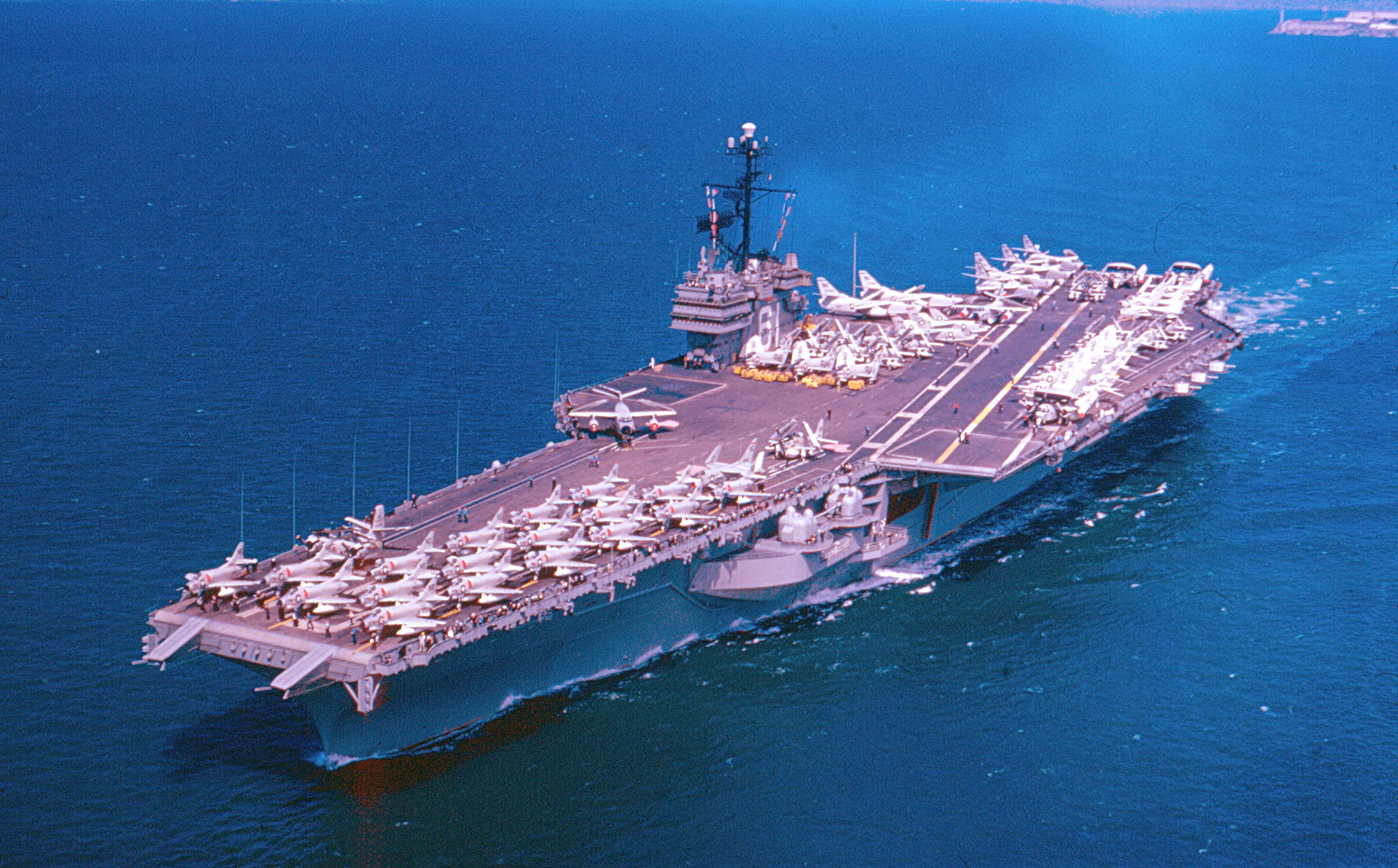
- USS Ranger in August 1961

History

United States
- Name: Ranger
- Namesake: USS Ranger
- Ordered: 1 February 1954
- Builder: Newport News Shipbuilding
- Cost: $182 million (1954); ($2.18 billion today)
- Laid down: 2 August 1954
- Launched: 29 September 1956
- Sponsored by: Miriam J. Radford; (Mrs. Arthur W. Radford)
- Acquired: 1 August 1957
- Commissioned: 10 August 1957
- Decommissioned: 10 July 1993
- Reclassified: CV-61
- Stricken: 8 March 2004
- Identification: Callsign: NHKG; Hull number: CVA-61
- Nickname(s): Danger Ranger; Top Gun
- Fate: Scrapped, 1 November 2017
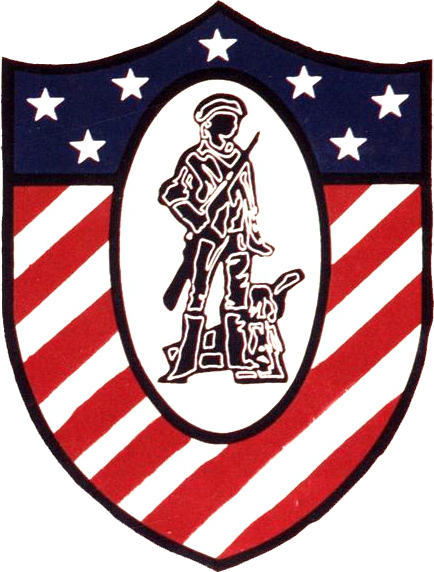
- Badge

General characteristics
- Class & type: Forrestal-class aircraft carrier
- Displacement: 56,300 long tons (57,200 t) light; 81,101 long tons (82,402 t) full load
- Length: 1,071 ft (326 m)
- Beam: 130 ft (40 m) waterline; 249 ft 6 in (76.05 m) extreme
- Draft: 37 ft (11 m)
- Propulsion: 4 geared turbines, 4 shafts, 280,000 shaft horsepower (210 MW); 8 Babcock & Wilcox boilers
- Speed: 34 knots (63 km/h; 39 mph)
- Complement: 3,826 officers and men.
- Sensors & processing systems: AN/SPS-48 3D air search radar; AN/SPS-49 2D air search radar
- Electronic warfare & decoys: Mark 36 SRBOC
- Armament: 8 × 5"/54 caliber Mark 42 guns (127 mm) (removed); NATO Sea Sparrow; Phalanx CIWS
- Armor: Belt: 6 in (152 mm); Flight deck: 3 in (76 mm); Torpedo Bulkheads: 3 in (76 mm)
- Aircraft carried: 70–90

The seventh USS Ranger (CV/CVA-61) was the third of four Forrestal-class supercarriers built for the United States Navy in the 1950s. Although all four ships of the class were completed with angled decks, Ranger had the distinction of being the first U.S. carrier built from the beginning as an angled-deck ship.

Commissioned in 1957, she served extensively in the Pacific, especially the Vietnam War, for which she earned 13 battle stars. Near the end of her career, she also served in the Indian Ocean and Persian Gulf.

Ranger was decommissioned in 1993, and was stored at Bremerton, Washington, until March 2015. She was then moved to Brownsville for scrapping, which was completed in November 2017.

== Construction and trials ==
Ranger was the first American aircraft carrier to be laid down as an angled-deck ship (her elder sisters Forrestal and Saratoga had been laid down as axial-deck ships and were converted for an angled deck while under construction). She was laid down 2 August 1954 by Newport News Shipbuilding and Drydock Co., Newport News, Virginia in Shipway 10. Her partially completed hull was floated and placed in Shipway 11 four months later for final completion. Ranger was launched 29 September 1956, sponsored by Mrs. Arthur Radford (wife of Admiral Arthur W. Radford, Chairman of the Joint Chiefs of Staff) and commissioned at the Norfolk Naval Shipyard 10 August 1957, Captain Charles T. Booth II in command.

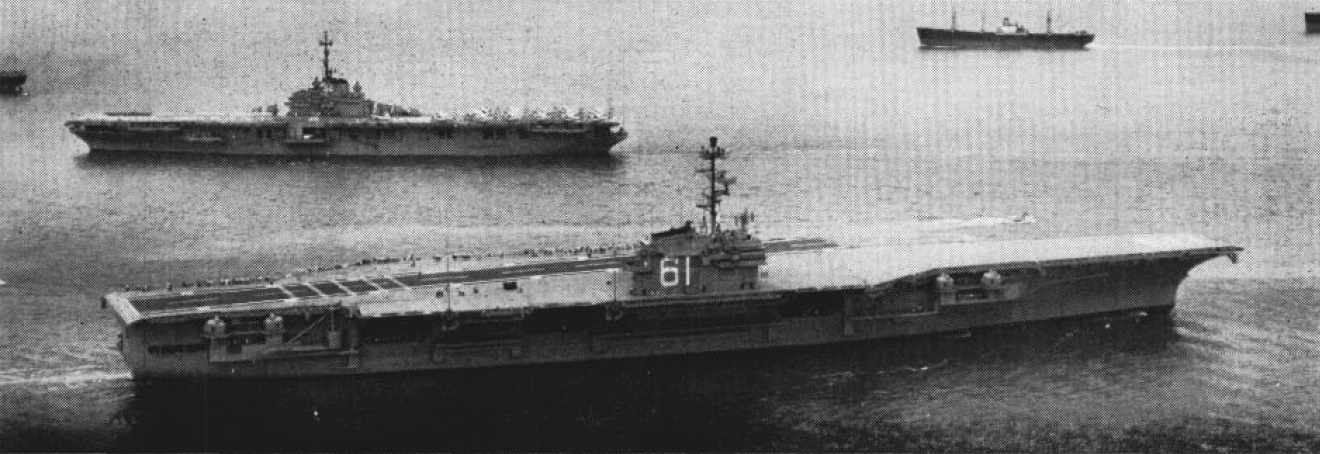
Ranger departing for sea trials in 1957, passing USS Leyte.

Ranger joined the U.S. Atlantic Fleet on 3 October 1957. Just prior to sailing on 4 October for Guantánamo Bay, Cuba, for shakedown, she received the men and planes of Attack Squadron 85. She conducted air operations, individual ship exercises, and final acceptance trials along the eastern seaboard and in the Caribbean Sea until 20 June 1958. Noted artist Jack Coggins was commissioned by the United States Naval Institute to paint the new aircraft carrier; his artwork appeared on the cover of their Proceedings Magazine of July 1958. She then departed Norfolk, Virginia, with 200 Naval Reserve officer candidates for a two-month cruise that took the carrier around Cape Horn. She arrived at her new homeport, Naval Air Station Alameda, Alameda, California, on 20 August and joined the Pacific Fleet.

== Service ==
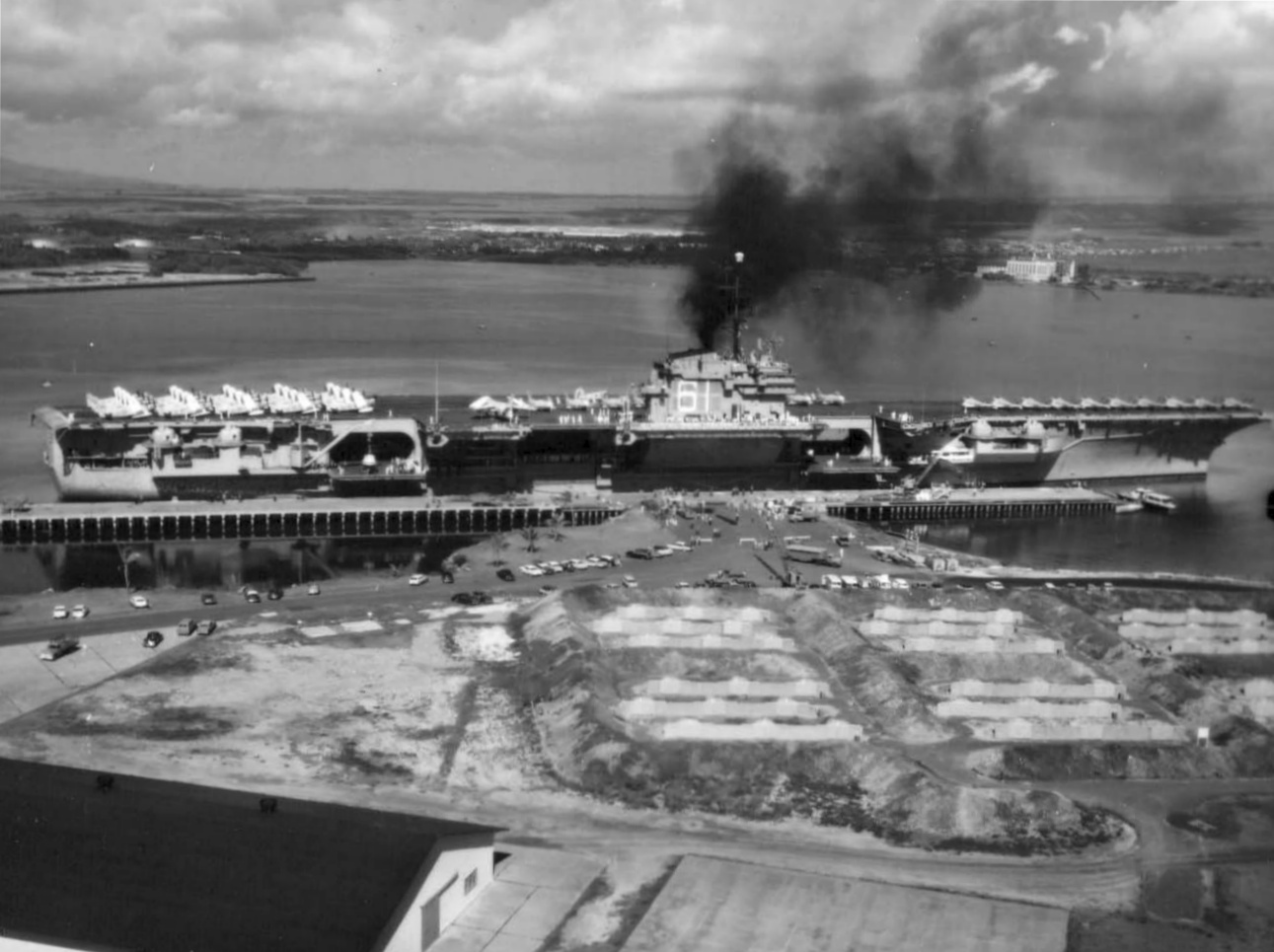
Ranger at Pearl Harbor, 1959.

The carrier spent the remainder of 1958 in pilot qualification training for Air Group 14 and fleet exercises along the California coast. Departing 3 January 1959 for final training in Hawaiian waters until 17 February, she next sailed as the flagship of Rear Admiral Henry H. Caldwell, Commander, Carrier Division Two, to join the Seventh Fleet. Air operations off Okinawa were followed by maneuvers with SEATO naval units out of Subic Bay, Philippines. A special weapons warfare exercise and a patrol along the southern seaboard of Japan followed. During this first WestPac deployment, Ranger launched more than 7,000 sorties in support of 7th Fleet operations. She returned to San Francisco Bay 27 July. During the next 6 months, Ranger was kept in a high state of readiness through participation in exercises and coastal fleet operations.

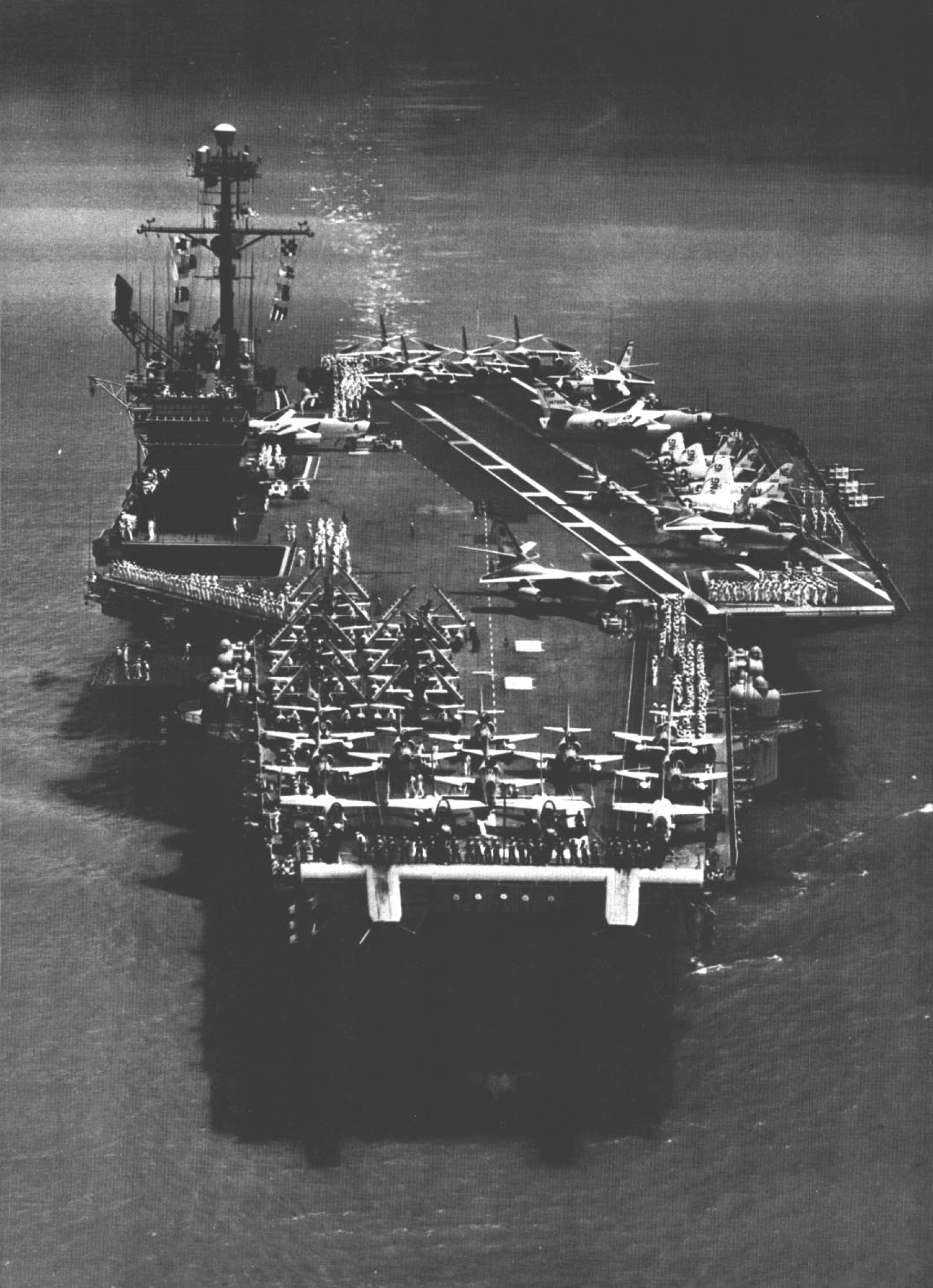
Ranger comes alongside at Pearl Harbor in March 1962 at the end of a WESTPAC cruise.

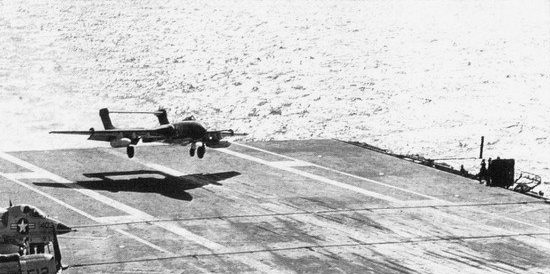
Sea Vixen of 892 NAS lands on Ranger in January 1963.

With Carrier Air Group 9 embarked, she departed Alameda on 6 February 1960 for a second WestPac deployment and returned to Alameda 30 August. From 11 August 1961 through 8 March 1962, Ranger deployed to the Far East a third time.

The next seven months were filled with intensive training along the western seaboard in preparation for operations in Southeast Asia. Ranger departed Alameda on 9 November for brief operations off Hawaii, thence proceeded, via Okinawa, to the Philippines. She steamed to the South China Sea 1 May 1963 to support possible Laotian operations. When the political situation in Laos relaxed 4 May, she resumed her operations schedule with the 7th Fleet. Arriving at Alameda from the Far East 14 June 1963, she underwent overhaul in the San Francisco Naval Shipyard 7 August 1963 through 10 February 1964. Refresher training out of Alameda commenced 25 March, interrupted by an operational cruise to Hawaii from 19 June to 10 July.

In May 1964, Ranger was deployed near French Polynesia in the Pacific Ocean to monitor the French nuclear tests on Moruroa, a task made possible by launching and recovering a Lockheed U-2 from its flight deck. Work on modifying the U-2 for carrier landing and take-off started in late 1963, and one accident occurred during the carrier landing operation when the aircraft piloted by test pilot Bob Schumacher crashed.

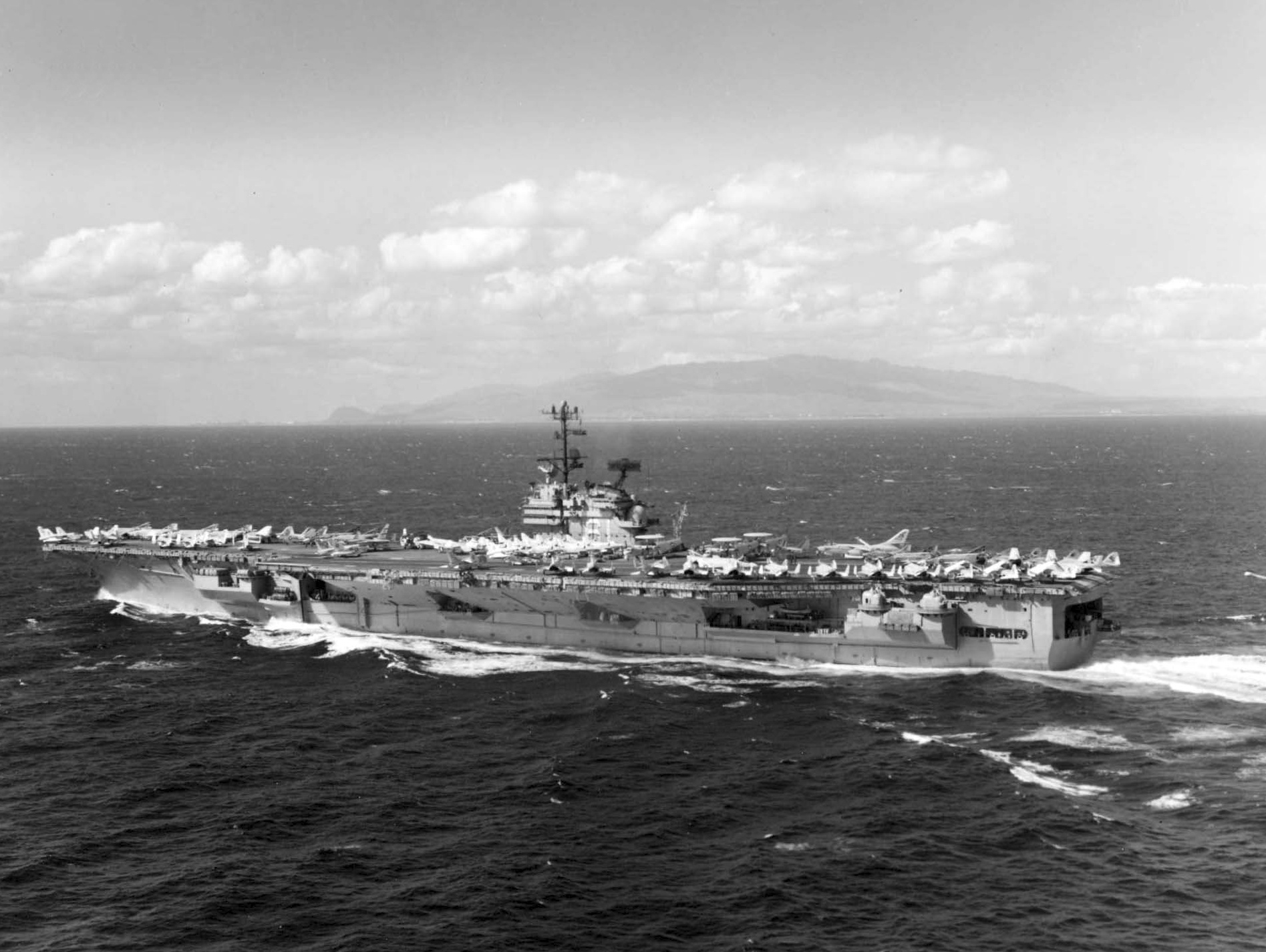
Ranger off Hawaii in November 1967, having departed for her 1967-68 WESTPAC cruise.

=== Vietnam War service ===
Ranger again sailed for the Far East on 6 August 1964. This deployment came on the heels of the Gulf of Tonkin incident. Ranger made only an eight-hour stop in Pearl Harbor on 10 August, then hurried on to Subic Bay, then to Yokosuka, Japan. In the latter port on 17 October 1964, she became the flagship of Rear Admiral Miller, who commanded Fast Carrier Task Force 77. In the following months, she helped the 7th Fleet continue its role of steady watchfulness to keep sea lanes open and stop Communist infiltration by sea.

General William Westmoreland, commanding Military Assistance Command, Vietnam, visited Ranger on 9 March 1965 to confer with Rear Admiral Miller. Ranger continued air strikes on enemy targets inland until 13 April when a fuel line broke, ignited and engulfed her No. 1 main machinery room in flames. The fire was extinguished in little over an hour. There was one fatality. She put into Subic Bay 15 April and sailed on the 20th for Alameda, arriving home on 6 May. She entered the San Francisco Naval Shipyard 13 May and remained there under overhaul until 30 September 1965.

Following refresher training, Ranger departed Alameda on 10 December 1965 to rejoin the 7th Fleet. She and her embarked Carrier Air Wing 14 received the Navy Unit Commendation for exceptionally meritorious service during combat operations in Southeast Asia from 10 January to 6 August 1966.

Ranger departed the Gulf of Tonkin on 6 August for Subic Bay, then steamed via Yokosuka for Alameda, arriving on the 25th. She stood out of San Francisco Bay 28 September and entered Puget Sound Naval Shipyard two days later for overhaul. The carrier departed Puget Sound on 30 May 1967 for training out of San Diego and Alameda. On 21 July 1967, she logged her 88,000th carrier landing.

From June until November, Ranger underwent a long and intensive period of training designed to make her fully combat ready. Attack Carrier Air Wing 2 (CVW-2) embarked on 15 September 1967, with the new A-7 Corsair II jet attack plane and the UH-2C Seasprite rescue helicopter, making Ranger the first carrier to deploy with these powerful new aircraft. From carrier refresher training for CVW-2, Ranger proceeded to fleet exercise "Moon Festival". From 9 to 16 October, the carrier and her air wing participated in every aspect of a major fleet combat operation.

Ranger departed Alameda on 4 November 1967 for WestPac. Arriving at Yokosuka on 21 November, she relieved Constellation and sailed for the Philippines on the 24th. After arriving at Subic Bay on 29 November, she made final preparations for combat operations in the Gulf of Tonkin. The Commander, Carrier Division 3, embarked on 30 November as Commander, TG 77.7, and Ranger departed Subic Bay on 1 December for Yankee Station.

Arriving on station on 3 December 1967, Ranger commenced another period of sustained combat operations against North Vietnam. During the next five months, her planes hit a wide variety of targets, including ferries, bridges, airfields, and military installations. Truck parks, rail facilities, antiaircraft guns, and SAM sites were also treated to doses of Air Wing 2's firepower. Bob Hope's Christmas Show came to Ranger in the Gulf of Tonkin on 21 December. Another welcome break in the intense pace of operations came with a call at Yokosuka during the first week of April. Returning to Yankee Station on 11 April, Ranger again struck objectives in North Vietnam.

At the end of January 1968, Pueblo was seized by North Korea. Ranger turned north and proceeded at full speed from the tropical waters off Vietnam to the frigid waters off North Korea as part of Operation Formation Star. The ship had been on the combat line in Vietnam for one month and was due to for rest and recreation. At the conclusion of the North Korea deployment, the ship had been at sea for 65 days. The carrier stopped at the small Japanese port of Sasebo for several days, then proceeded back to combat operations.

After five months of intensive operations, Ranger called at Hong Kong on 5 May 1968 and then steamed for home. There followed a shipyard availability at Puget Sound that ended with Ranger's departure 29 July for San Francisco. Three months of leave, upkeep and training culminated in another WestPac deployment 26 October 1968 through 17 May 1969.

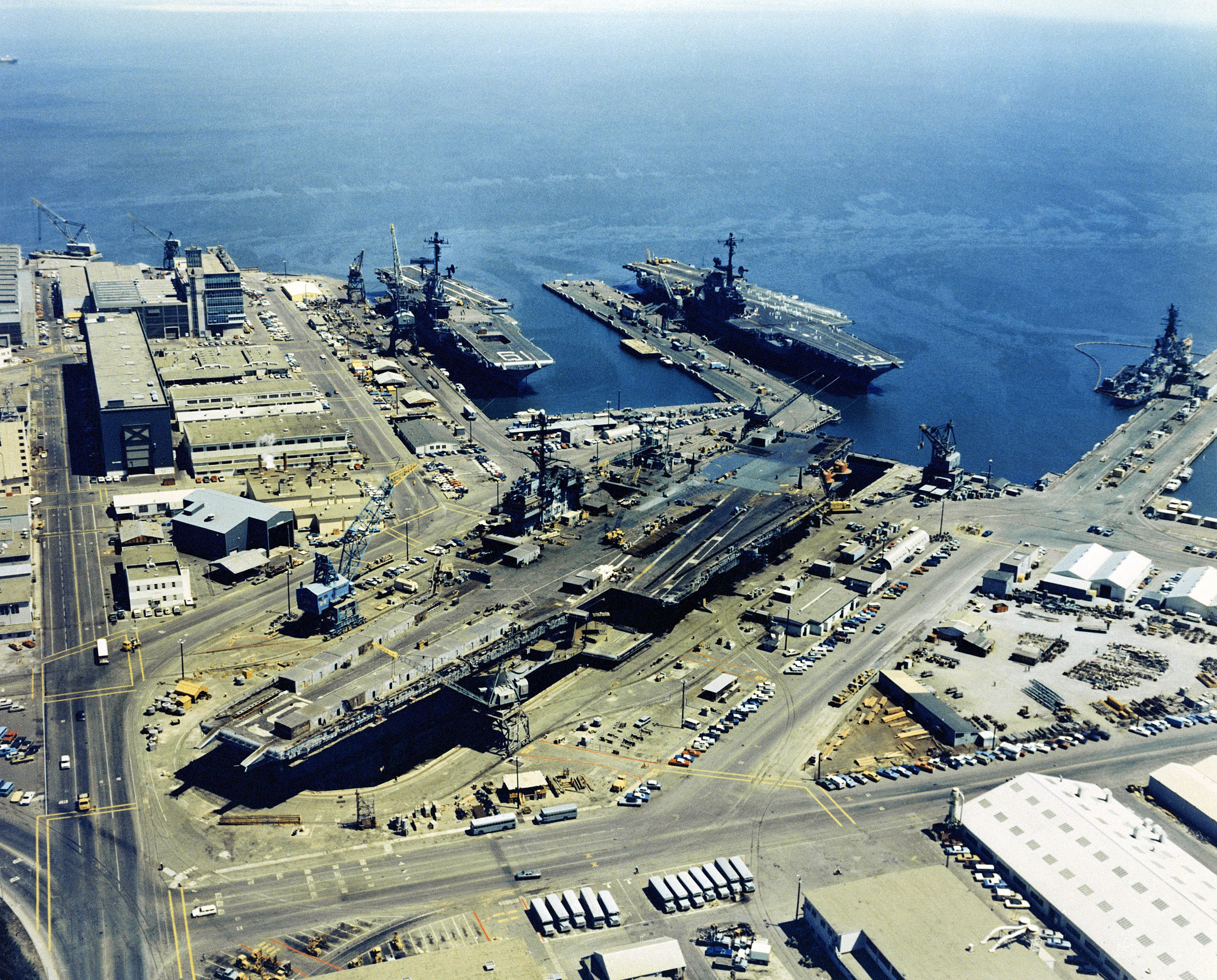
Ranger in drydock at San Francisco in 1971

She departed Alameda on yet another WestPac deployment in October 1969 as the flagship for Rear Admiral J.C. Donaldson, Commander, Carrier Division Three, and Captain J.P. Moorer as commanding officer, and remained so employed until 18 May 1970. During this time, the ship spent at least two extended periods on Yankee Station, the longest being 45 days, due to mechanical problems with the carrier that was to relieve her. A pleasant break in the lives of Ranger's crew came with the arrival of the Bob Hope show on 24 December 1969. Upon leaving Yankee after one tour and on the way to Sasebo, Ranger was ordered to stand off the coast of Korea for three days due to North Korea forcing down a US C-130 and holding the crew. Initially, Ranger was to leave the line on Yankee Station for a week of R&R in Subic Bay while offloading supplies, then to Japan and on to Australia and home. A day before Ranger was to leave the line she was ordered to hold on station and fly the first sorties on Cambodia. Finally leaving Yankee Station, Ranger made a fast three-day offload in Subic Bay and a two-day port call in Sasebo and back to Alameda, arriving 1 June. Ranger spent the rest of the summer engaged in operations off the west coast, departing for her sixth WestPac cruise in late October 1970. On 10 March 1971, Ranger, along with USS Kitty Hawk, set a record of 233 strike sorties for one day in action against North Vietnam. During April, the three carriers assigned to Task Force 77 – Ranger, Kitty Hawk, and USS Hancock – provided a constant two-carrier posture on Yankee Station. Hours of employment remained unchanged, with one carrier on daylight hours and one on the noon to midnight schedule. Strike emphasis was placed on the interdiction of major Laotian entry corridors to South Vietnam. She returned to Alameda 7 June 1971, and remained in port for the rest of 1971 and the first five months of 1972 undergoing regular overhaul.

On 27 May 1972, she returned to West Coast operation until 16 November, when she embarked upon her seventh WestPac deployment. This had been delayed four months when one of the engines was disabled after Navy fireman E-3 Patrick Chenoweth was accused of dropping a heavy paint scraper into a main reduction gear, one of around two dozen acts of sabotage Ranger suffered between 7 June 1972 and 16 October 1972. Chenoweth was charged with "sabotage in time of war", and faced 30 years imprisonment, but was acquitted by a general court-martial.

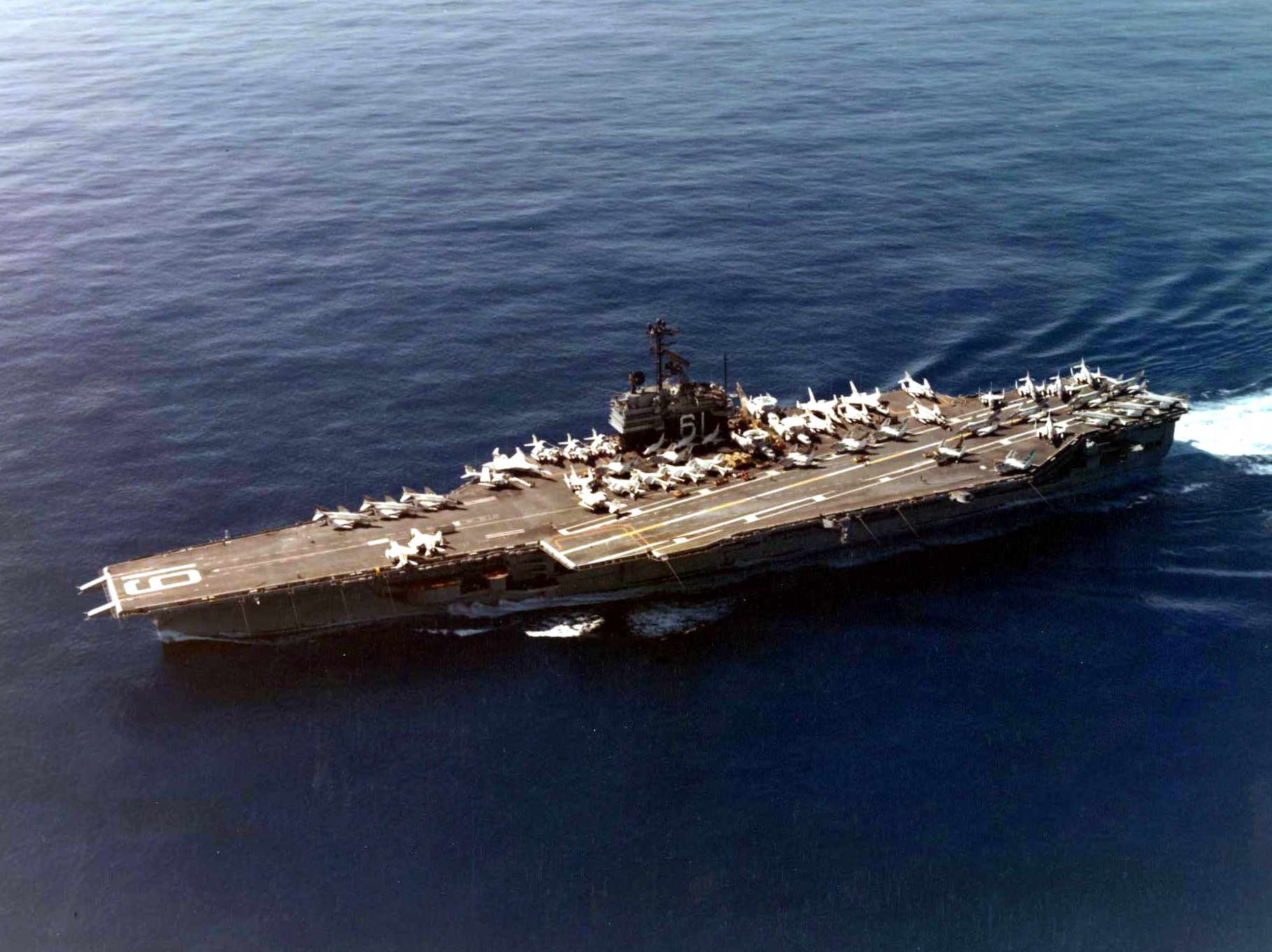
Ranger in 1974

On 18 December 1972, the Linebacker II campaign was initiated when negotiations in the Paris peace talks stalemated. Participating carriers were Ranger, Enterprise, Saratoga, Oriskany, and America. In an intensified version of Operation Linebacker, bombing of North Vietnam above the 20th parallel and reseeding of the mine fields were resumed, and concentrated strikes were carried out against surface-to-air missile and antiaircraft artillery sites, enemy army barracks, petroleum storage areas, Haiphong naval and shipyard areas, and railroad and truck stations. Navy tactical air attack sorties were centered in the coastal areas around Hanoi and Haiphong, with 505 Navy sorties were carried out in this area. These operations ended on 29 December when the North Vietnamese returned to the peace table; on 27 January 1973, the Vietnam cease-fire came into effect, and Oriskany, America, Enterprise, and Ranger, on Yankee Station, cancelled all combat sorties.

In July 1972, while Ranger was tied up at Alameda Naval Air Station, the ship was damaged when someone apparently tossed a paint scraper and two bolts into the ship's main reduction gear. This resulted in almost a million dollars in damages and delayed the ship's redeployment by more than three months. A court martial found the suspect not guilty of "sabotage in time of war."

=== Post-war service in the 1970s ===
Ranger returned to Alameda in August 1973. She was ordered immediately to refit and repair at Long Beach Naval Base where she was prepared for her next WESPAC Cruise over the next ninety days. Her air wing was lifted aboard by giant crane in Long Beach. She spent two weeks shaking down active duty and Reserve pilots. She returned to Alameda. There were two more two-week shake down cruises between January and April 1974. On 7 May 1974 she deployed again to the western Pacific. During this cruise, Ranger was again deployed to Yankee Station to participate in operations significant to the withdrawal of forces involved there. She returned to homeport on 18 October. On 28 May 1976, while on deployment, helicopter crews from HS-4 aboard Ranger, detachments from HC-3 on Camden, Mars and White Plains, and helicopters from Naval Air Station Cubi Point, Republic of the Philippines, assisted in Philippine disaster relief efforts in the flood ravaged areas of central Luzon. Over 1,900 people were evacuated; more than 370,000 pounds (170,000 kg) of relief supplies and 9,340 US gallons (35,400 L) of fuel were provided by Navy and Air Force helicopters.

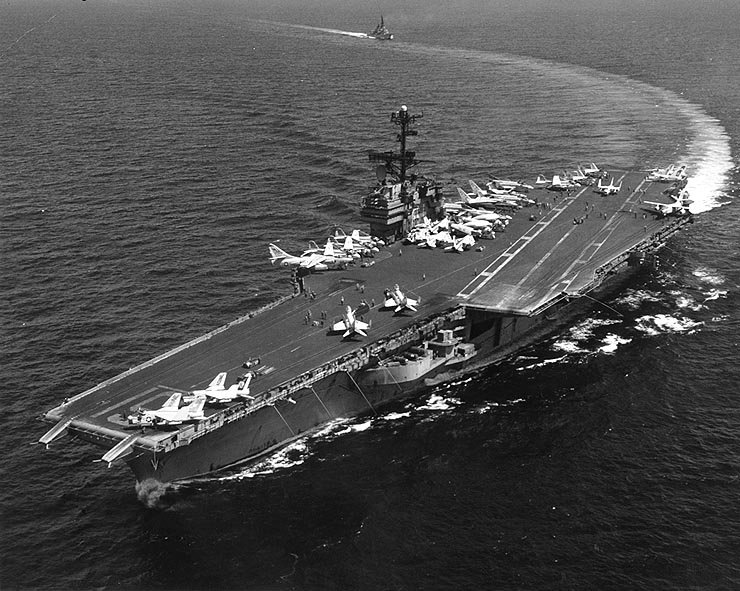
Ranger, circa 1978

On 12 July 1976, Ranger and her escort ships of Task Force 77.7 entered the Indian Ocean and were assigned to operate off the coast of Kenya in response to a threat of military action in Kenya by Ugandan forces in the wake of the rescue of Israeli hostages held at Entebbe Airport in Uganda several days before.

In February 1977, Ranger departed Naval Air Station North Island for the Puget Sound Naval Shipyard, Bremerton, Washington, for major overhaul. While in overhaul, she received significant technological upgrades to her command information systems and flight deck gear, and was fitted with Sea Sparrow missile defense systems. Additionally, the main machinery spaces were refitted with more reliable 'General Regulator' forced-balance automatic boiler and combustion-control systems. In March 1978, the overhaul was completed and she began several months of shakedown cruises and sea trials for recertifications.

On 21 February 1979, Ranger deployed for her 14th WestPac cruise, tentatively scheduled to cross the Indian Ocean to present a show of force during the strife between North and South Yemen, a mission she would not complete. On 5 April 1979, she collided with the Liberian-flagged tanker MV Fortune just southeast of Singapore while entering the Straits of Malacca. While the large oil tanker was severely damaged, Ranger endured a significant gash in her bow, rendering two fuel tanks unusable. Ranger turned back to Subic Bay, for temporary repairs and then to Yokosuka, for full repair. The collision resulted in 10,000 tons of crude oil spilled in the South China Sea. MV Fortune was hauling 100,000 tons of light crude from Kuwait to Japan.

=== 1980s ===
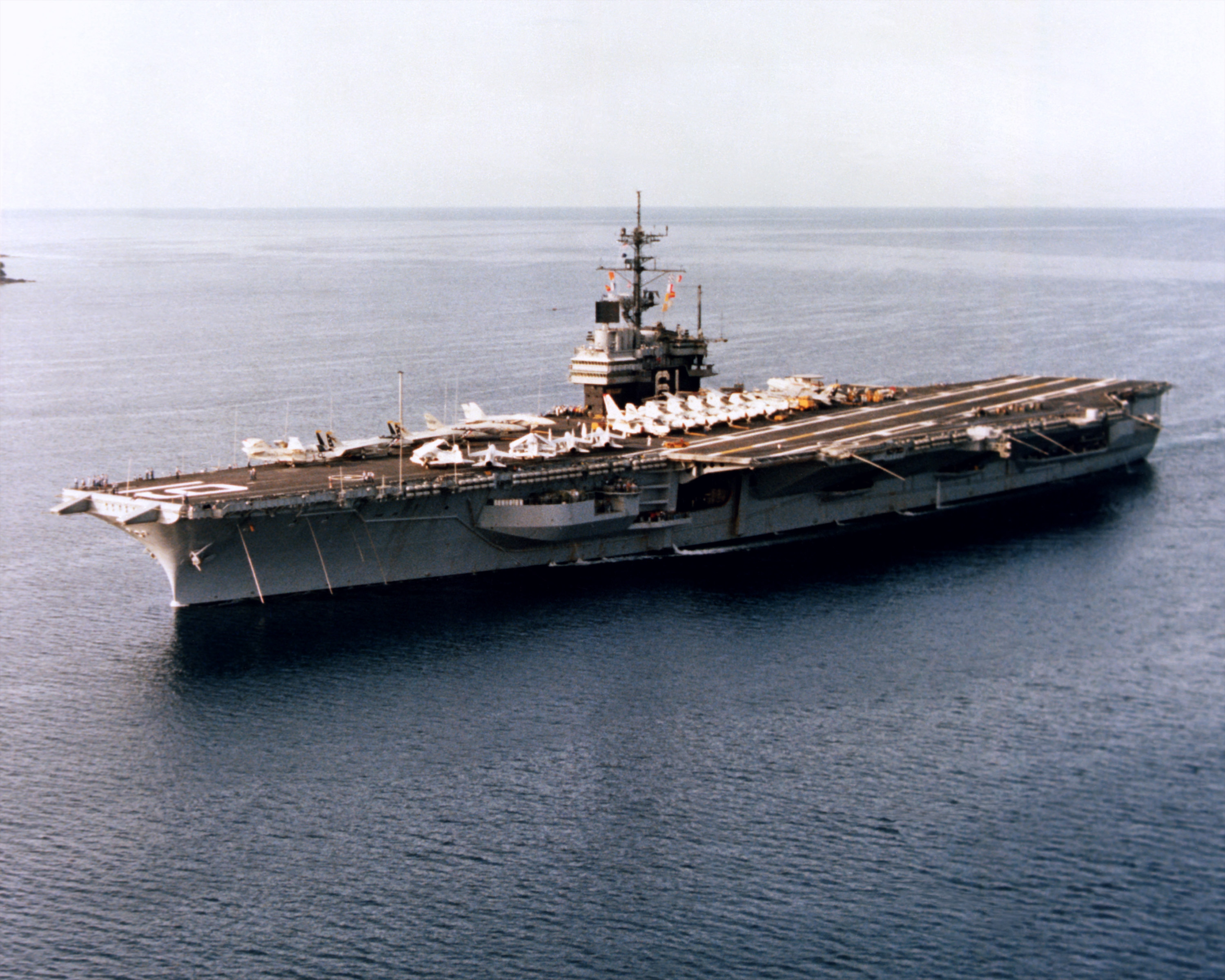
Ranger cruising off the coast of California in 1983

In September 1980, Ranger departed her homeport of San Diego for the 15th WestPac cruise and again crossed into the Indian Ocean via the Straits of Malacca, this time without incident. Ranger proceeded to GONZO Station to continue the US Navy's show of force in the region during Iran hostage crisis, which at that point was in its tenth month. Ranger remained on-station for over 120 days, during which time the hostages were released on 20 January 1981, the 444th day of the crisis. Ranger was awarded the Navy Expeditionary Medal, for both the ship and her company. She returned to homeport on 5 May 1981.

On 20 March 1981, under the command of CAPT Dan Pedersen, Ranger rescued 138 Vietnamese boat people from the South China Sea and brought them to the United Nations High Commission for Refugees (UNHCR) in Manila, Philippines. In the same year, following the refugee rescue in 1981, Pedersen was given a nonpunitive letter of censure by Vice Adm. Robert F. Schoultz, commander of the Naval Air Force, United States Pacific Fleet, (COMNAVAIRPAC), after a three-week investigation into the 14 April 1981 death of Airman Paul Trerice, 20 years old, of Algonac, Michigan. Trerice had died after being on a bread-and-water diet for three days, then taking part in punitive exercises in the correctional custody unit. According to The Washington Post, "Trerice became abusive in the Ranger's correctional custody unit and had to be subdued in a struggle shortly before his death." The ship was just completing a successful WestPAC/Indian Ocean deployment and was at Subic Bay at the time. The Navy reported the airman faced disciplinary action for leaving his post and for leaving the ship twice without permission in Hong Kong.

A federal court dismissed criminal charges brought by the Trerice family against Pedersen and other officers on the Ranger, and the Ninth Circuit Court of Appeals upheld the dismissal.

On 26 February 1983, she received an official visit from Queen Elizabeth II and Prince Philip, who were on a West Coast tour to visit San Diego.

Ranger entered the history books on 21 March 1983 when an all-woman flight crew flying a C-1A Trader from VRC-40 "Truckin' Traders" landed aboard the carrier. The aircraft was commanded by LT Elizabeth M. Toedt and the crew included LTJG Cheryl A. Martin, Aviation Machinist's Mate 3rd Class Gina Greterman, and Aviation Machinist's Mate Airman Robin Banks.

On 1 November 1983, a fire broke out in #4 Main Machinery Room due to a fuel spill during fuel transfer operations while Ranger was deployed in the North Arabian Sea east of Oman. Six crewmen were killed as a result of the fire, which knocked out one of the ship's four engines and disabled one of her four shafts.Ranger returned to the Philippines after 121 consecutive days at sea. One enlisted man was imprisoned for two months of a three-month sentence for dereliction of duty relating to the fire, but the Navy released him early and reprimanded four officers after an investigation in 1984. The report blamed the fire, which resulted in $1.7 million ($5.27 million today) in damages in addition to the deaths, on engineering officers and their superiors.

In early 1985, Ranger was used to film some interior scenes for the film Top Gun. In 1986, the ship stood in for USS Enterprise (CVN-65) for scenes filmed for Star Trek IV: The Voyage Home.

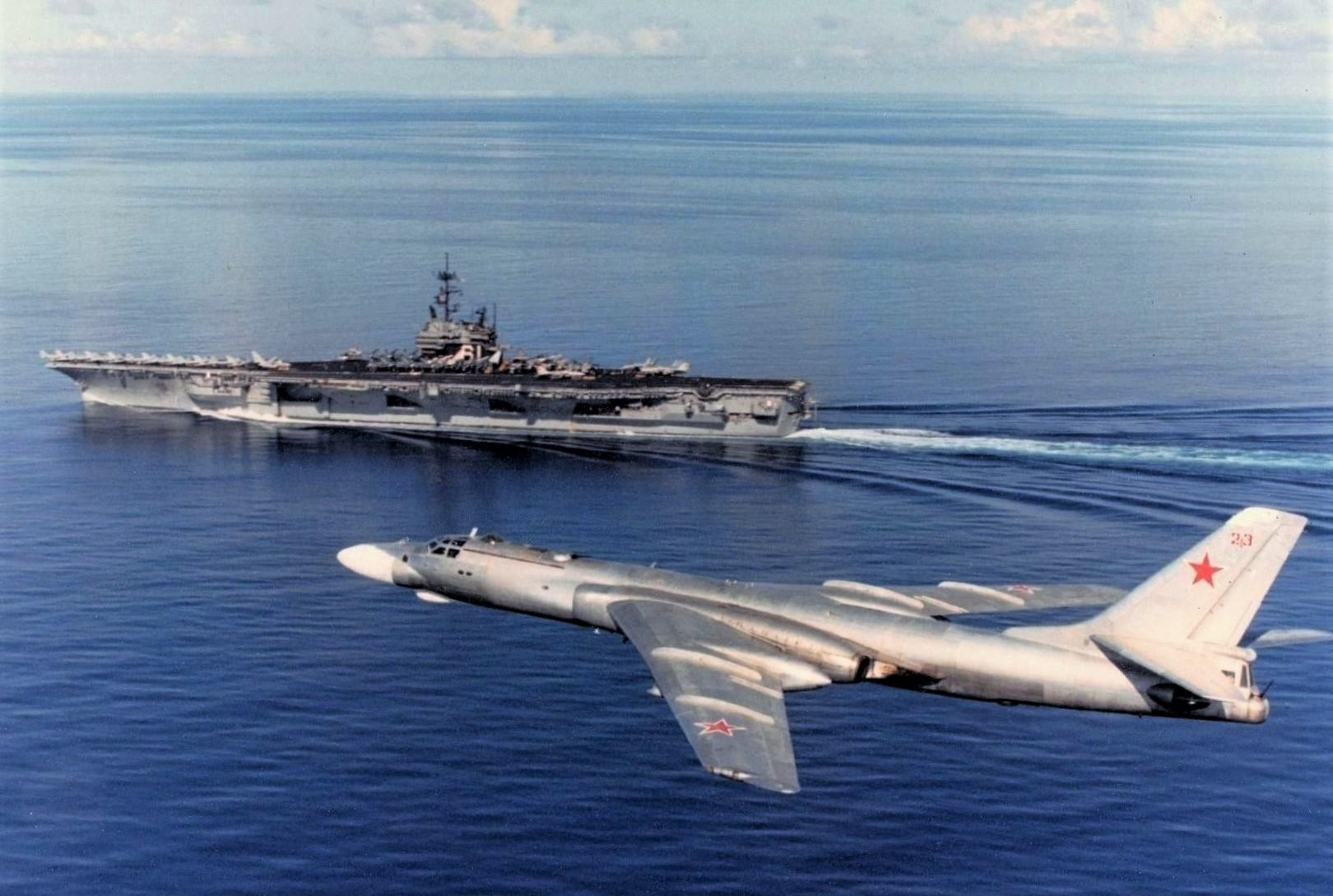
A Tu-16 "Badger C" of the AV-MF overflies Ranger during her 1989 WESTPAC cruise

On 14 July 1987, Ranger started her "Pearl" Anniversary Cruise. During this cruise, Ranger relieved Midway and her carrier group in the Indian Ocean. During this period, Ranger took part in Operation Earnest Will under which the Kuwait tankers were reflagged under US colors.

On 24 July 1987, Tactical Electronics Warfare Squadron 131 (VAQ-131) began the first Pacific Fleet deployment of the EA-6B Prowler equipped with AGM-88 HARM missiles, deployed in Ranger.

On 19 October 1987, Ranger took part in Operation Nimble Archer, an attack on two Iranian oil platforms in the Persian Gulf by US Navy forces. The attack was a response to Iran's missile attack three days earlier on MV Sea Isle City, a reflagged Kuwaiti oil tanker at anchor off Kuwait. The action occurred during Operation Earnest Will, the effort to protect Kuwaiti shipping amid the Iran-Iraq War. Air cover was provided by William H. Standley, two F-14 Tomcat fighters, and an E-2 Hawkeye from Ranger.

On 3 August 1989, Ranger rescued 39 Vietnamese refugees, adrift for 10 days on a barge in heavy seas and monsoon rains in the South China Sea, about 80 miles (130 km) from NAS Cubi Point. SH-3s Sea Kings from HS-14 along with two Sea Knights assisted. An A-6 Intruder from VA-145 spotted the barge, which had apparently broken loose from its mooring near a small island off the coast of Vietnam with 10 men on board. Twenty-nine other refugees from a sinking refugee boat climbed aboard the barge when it drifted out to sea. After examination by medical personnel, all were flown to NAS Cubi Point for further processing.

=== 1990s ===
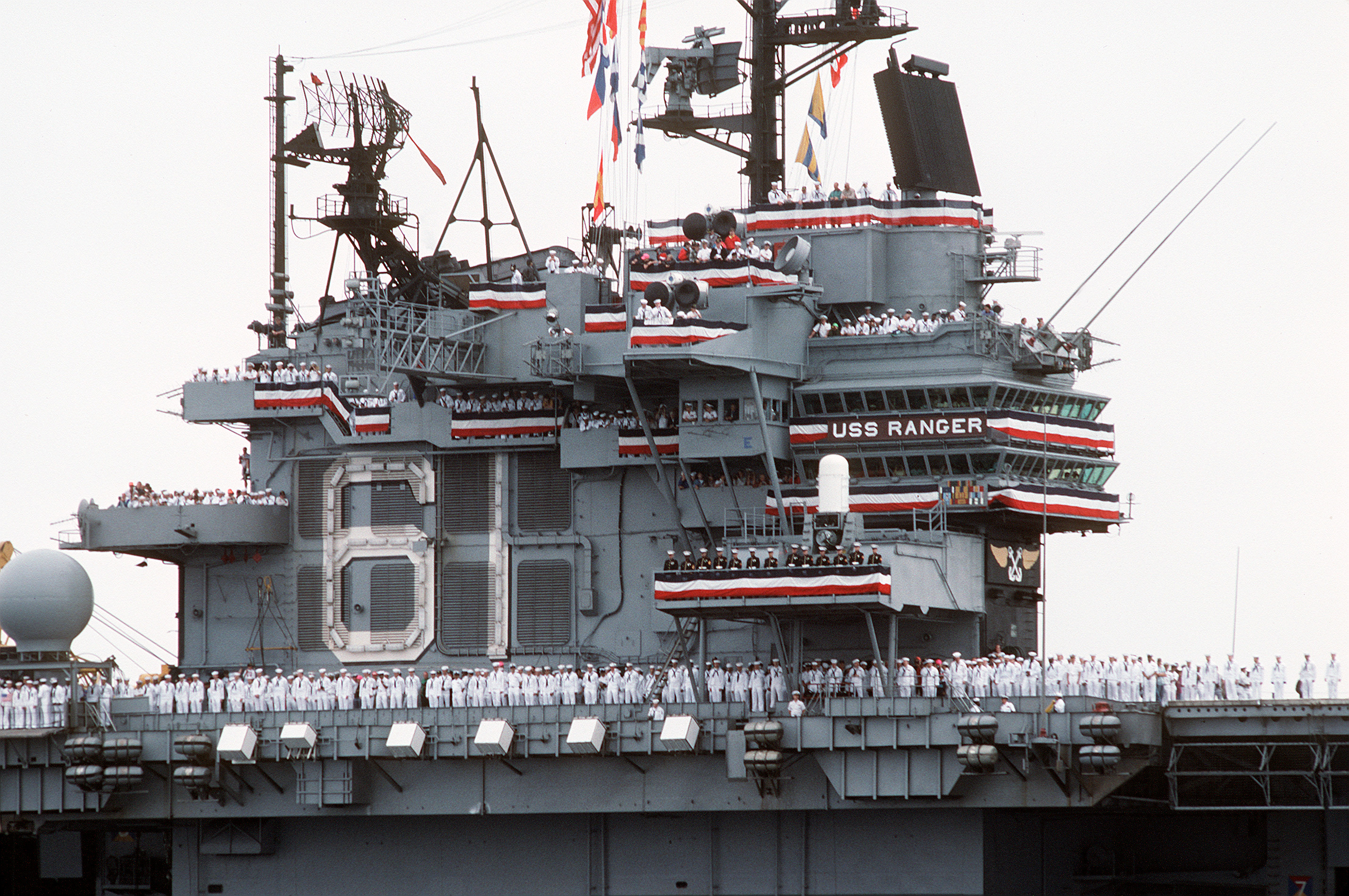
Ranger returns from Desert Storm

President George H. W. Bush addressed the nation on 16 January 1991 at 9 pm EST and announced that Operation Desert Storm had begun. The Navy launched 228 sorties from Ranger and Midway in the Persian Gulf, from Theodore Roosevelt en route to the Persian Gulf, and from John F. Kennedy, Saratoga, and America in the Red Sea. In addition, the Navy launched more than 100 Tomahawk missiles from nine ships in the Mediterranean Sea, the Red Sea, and the Persian Gulf.

An A-6E Intruder from Ranger was shot down two miles off the Iraqi coast by antiaircraft artillery on 18 January 1991, after laying MK36 naval mines on a waterway linking the Iraqi naval base of Umm Qasr with the Persian Gulf. The pilot and the navigator/bombardier were killed.

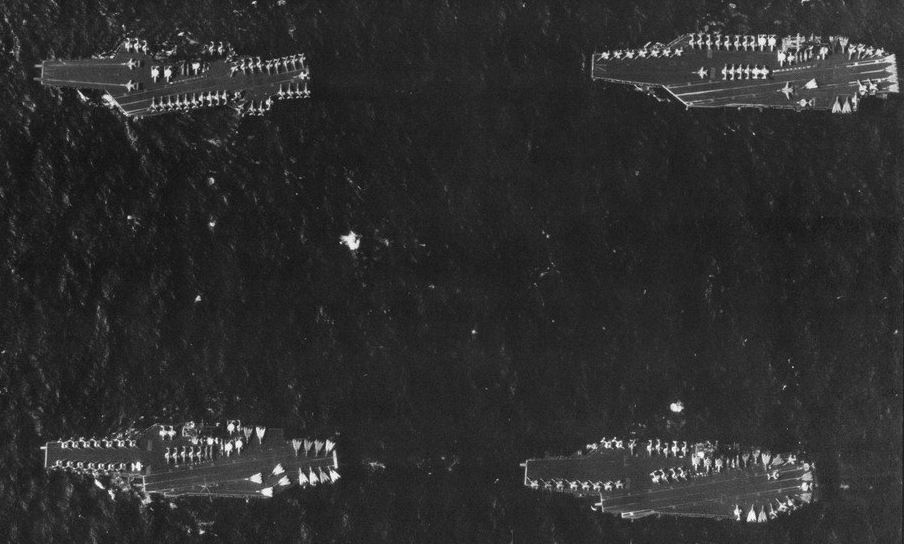
Four US Navy carriers form "Battle Force Zulu" following the 1991 Gulf War; Ranger (bottom left) cruises with USS Midway (top left), USS Theodore Roosevelt (top right) and USS America (bottom right)

On 26 January, an EA-6B Prowler from Ranger spotted two large tankers in a waterway northeast of Bubiyan Island. Two of Ranger's A-6Es hit one of them with an AGM-123 Skipper missile on the starboard side.

On 6 February, an F-14A Tomcat of Fighter Squadron 1 (VF-1) "Wolfpack" launched from the Ranger downed an Iraqi Mi-8 Hip helicopter with an AIM-9M Sidewinder missile. At 9 pm EST on 27 February, President Bush declared Kuwait had been liberated and Operation Desert Storm would end at midnight.

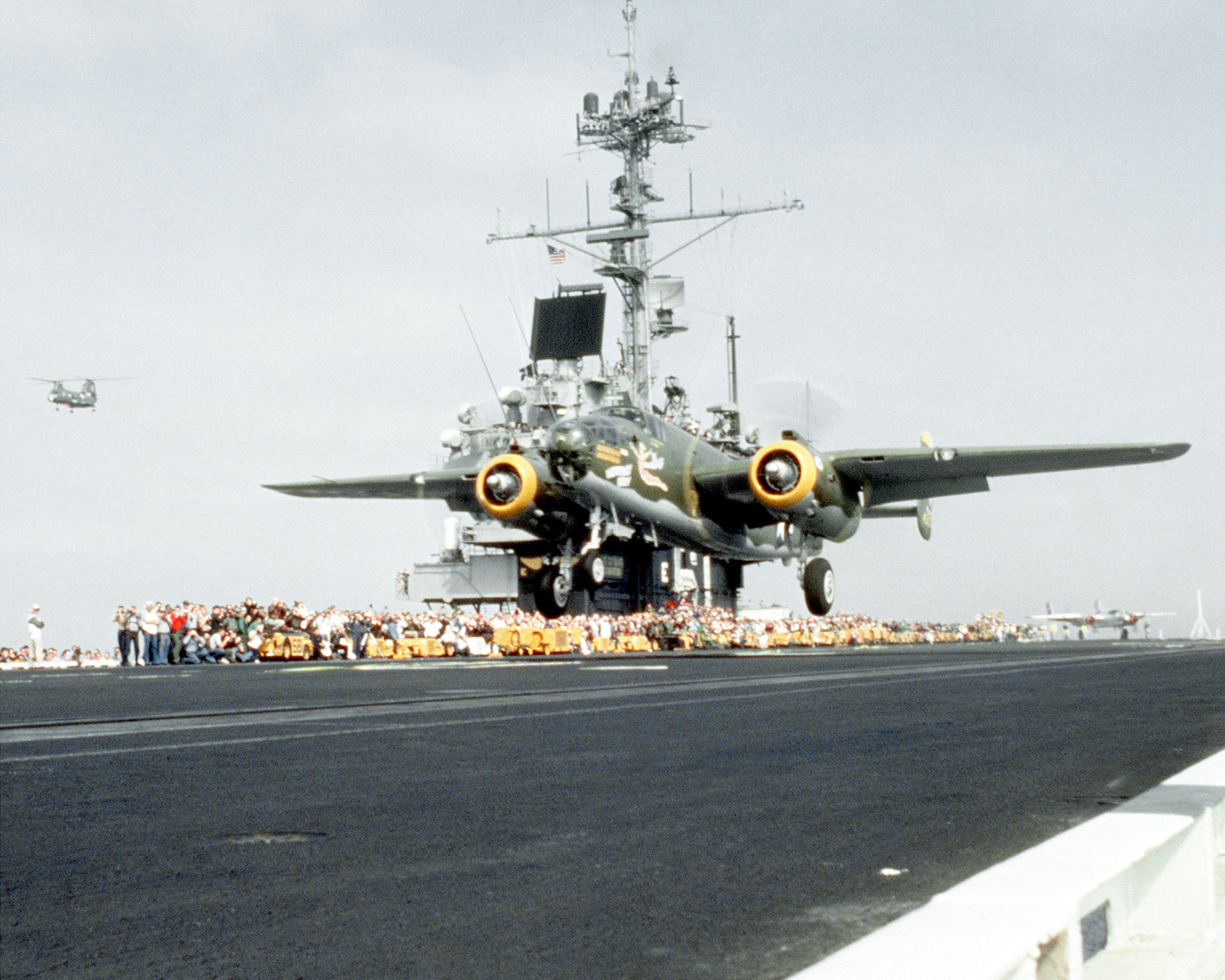
The restored World War II B-25 Mitchell bomber aircraft Heavenly Body takes off from the deck of Ranger

On 21 April 1992, in harmony with other World War II 50th-anniversary festivities, Ranger participated in the commemorative re-enactment of the Doolittle Raid on Tokyo, Japan. Two World War II-era B-25 bombers were craned on board, and over 1,500 guests (including national, local and military media) were embarked to witness the two vintage aircraft travel down Ranger' flight deck and take off. In June, Ranger made an historic port visit to Vancouver, British Columbia, in conjunction with her final phase of pre-deployment workups.

Fully combat ready, Ranger began her 21st and final western Pacific and Indian Ocean deployment on 1 August 1992. On 18 August, she entered Yokosuka, for a six-day port visit and upkeep. Ranger entered the Persian Gulf on 14 September by transiting the Straits of Hormuz. The next day, Ranger relieved Independence in an unusual close-aboard ceremony and along with her embarked air wing, Carrier Air Wing 2, immediately began flying patrol missions in support of the United Kingdom and United States-declared "No Fly" zone in southern Iraq: Operation Southern Watch.

While in the Persian Gulf, former Cold War adversaries became at-sea partners as Ranger, British, and French naval forces joined with the Russian guided missile destroyer Admiral Vinogradov for an exercise involving communication, maneuvering, and signaling drills. During joint operations, a Russian Kamov Ka-27 "Helix" helicopter landed aboard Ranger. It was the first such landing on a US Navy aircraft carrier.

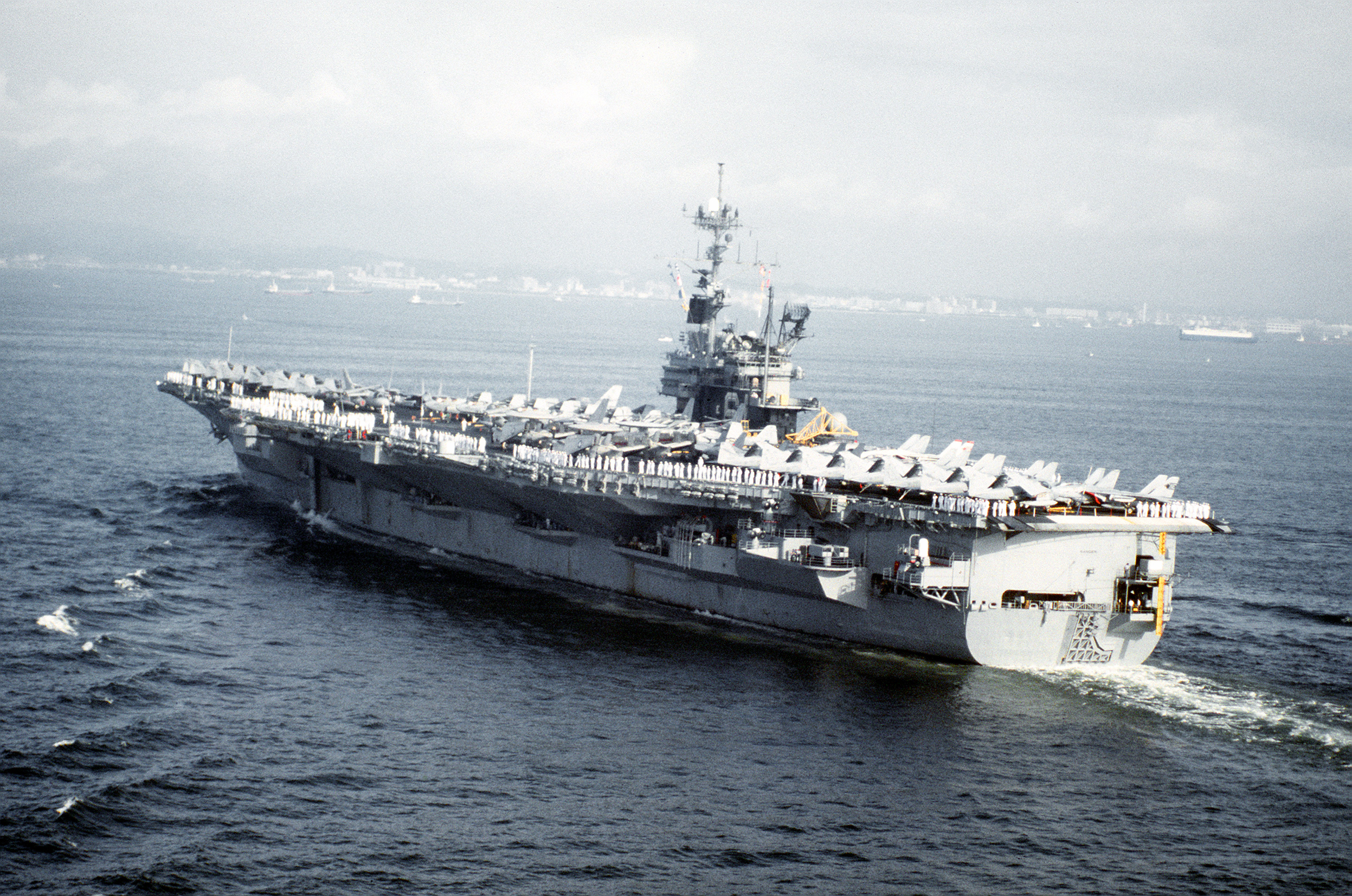
Ranger's last visit to Japan, August 1992

Ranger left the Persian Gulf on 4 December 1992 and steamed at high speed to the coast of Somalia. Ranger played a significant role in the massive relief effort for starving Somalis in Operation Restore Hope. The Ranger/CVW-2 team provided photo and visual reconnaissance, airborne air traffic control, logistics support, and on-call close air support for Navy and Marine amphibious forces. Throughout Operations Southern Watch and Restore Hope, Ranger took 63 digital photographs which were sent by International Marine Satellite to the Navy Office of Information within hours of being taken. This was the first time digital pictures were successfully transmitted from a US Navy ship at sea.

On 19 December 1992, Ranger was relieved on station by Kitty Hawk and began her last journey homeward to San Diego.

== Decommissioning and fate ==
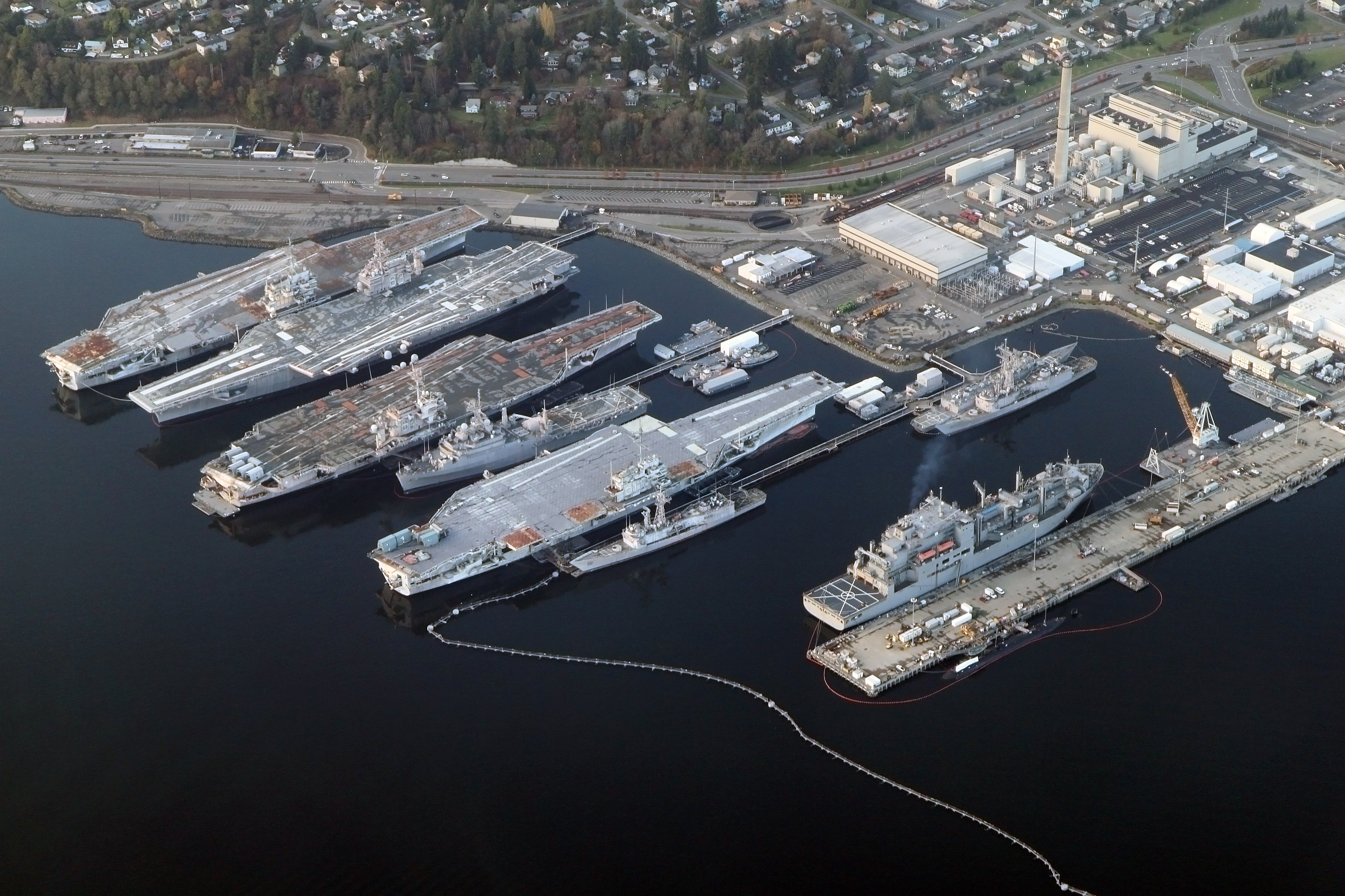
Ranger (right-most carrier in photo) awaits her fate along with Independence, Kitty Hawk, and Constellation at the Naval Inactive Ship Maintenance Facility in Bremerton, November 2012.

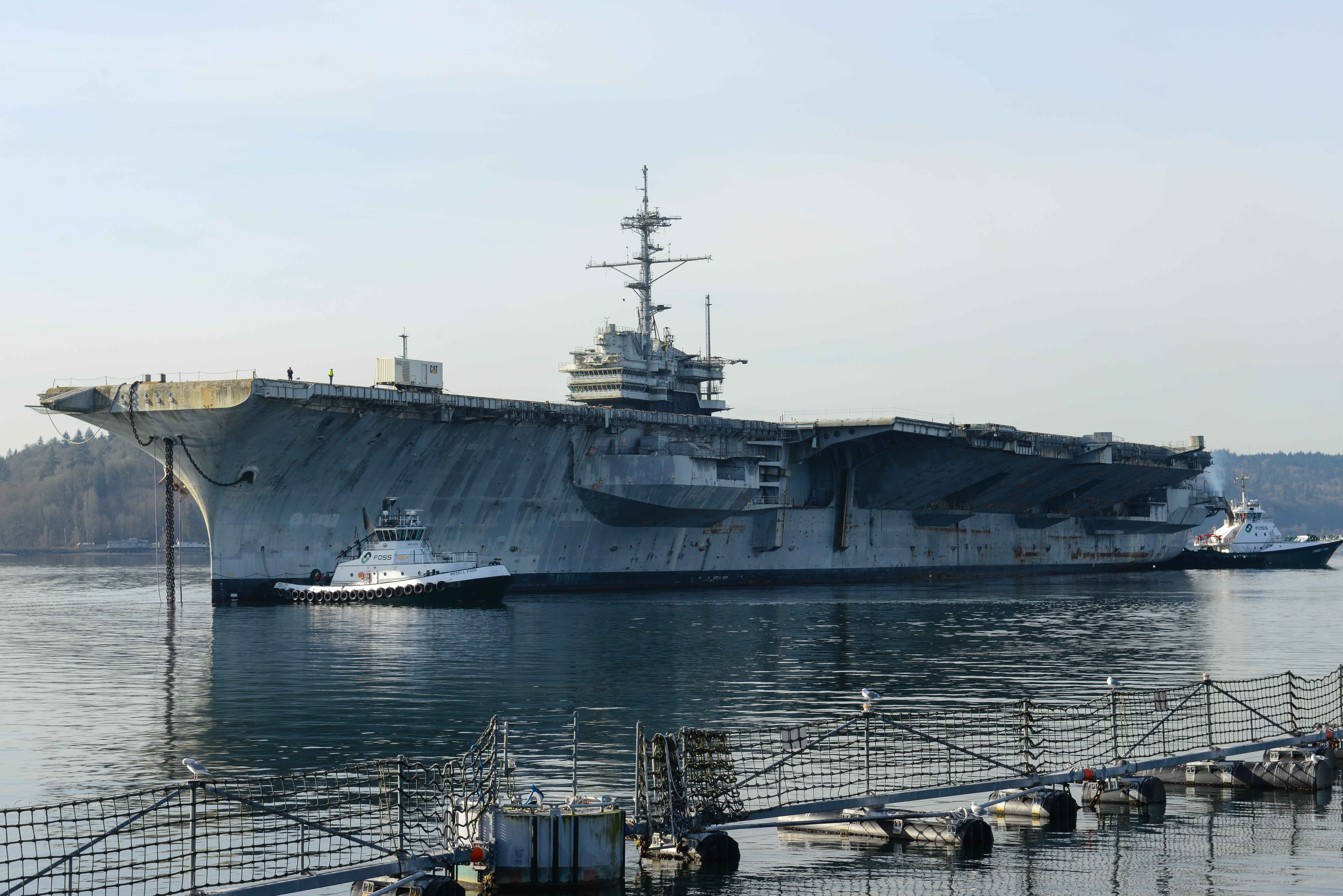
Ranger being towed from Naval Base Kitsap-Bremerton at the start of her voyage to be scrapped in Brownsville, Texas

After the late 1980s defense cuts, Ranger did not undergo the Service Life Extension Program (SLEP) modernization process as did her three sisters and the later Kitty Hawk-class ships, and by the early 1990s, her material condition was declining. Both the outgoing Bush and incoming Clinton administrations recommended cuts to the defense budget, so the retirement of Ranger, along with her sisters Forrestal and Saratoga, was put forth. Ranger was decommissioned on 10 July 1993 after 36 years of service, and was at the Naval Inactive Ship Maintenance Facility, Bremerton, Washington. This decommissioning came instead of a refit scheduled for the same year. Such an extension would have extended Ranger's life into 2002, requiring a reauthorization in 1994. In September 2010, the not-for-profit USS Ranger Foundation submitted an application to Naval Sea Systems Command proposing the donation of Ranger for use as a museum ship and multipurpose facility, to be located on the Columbia River at Chinook Landing Marine Park in Fairview, Oregon. However, in September 2012, NAVSEA rejected the foundation's proposal, and redesignated the ship for scrapping. Preparations for disposal Ranger were completed 29 May 2014.

In August 2014, a new attempt began to convince the Navy not to scrap the ship. A petition on Change.org attracted over 2500 signatures. The hope was that Ranger could be located in Long Beach harbor as a museum. However, when asked by the Long Beach Press-Telegram, NAVSEA stated that Ranger was no longer available for donation and was slated to be scrapped in 2015.

On 22 December 2014, the U.S. Navy paid one cent to International Shipbreaking of Brownsville, Texas, to tow and scrap Ranger. International Shipbreaking paid to tow her around South America, through the Straits of Magellan, as Ranger was too big to fit through the Panama Canal. The tow began on 5 March 2015 from the inactive ships maintenance facility, Bremerton, Washington, to Brownsville. International Shipbreaking expected to make a profit from Ranger after the costs of the tow and the actual dismantling of the ship.

On 7 April 2015, ex-Ranger was seen anchored about three miles offshore at Panama City, Panama, attracting a lot of wild speculation as President Obama was scheduled to arrive two days later, for the 7th Summit of the Americas. Newspapers went so far as to repeat the local speculation that the ship was there to provide security for President Obama. On 12 July 2015, Ranger arrived at Brownsville for scrapping. The scrapping process was completed on 1 November 2017, though more than five tons of historic items from the ship were preserved for display at the USS Lexington Museum.

Both of Ranger's anchors were reused on the 2003 commissioned, USS Ronald Reagan.

== Awards and decorations ==
Ranger earned 13 battle stars for service during the Vietnam War.

| Joint Meritorious Unit Award | Navy Unit Commendation with two stars | Meritorious Unit Commendation with four stars |
| Navy E Ribbon with two Battle "E" devices | Navy Expeditionary Medal | National Defense Service Medal with one star |
| Armed Forces Expeditionary Medal with seven stars | Vietnam Service Medal with ten stars | Southwest Asia Service Medal with three stars |
| Humanitarian Service Medal with one star | Sea Service Deployment Ribbon with ten stars | Republic of Vietnam Meritorious; Unit Citation (Gallantry Cross) |
| Republic of Vietnam Campaign Medal | Kuwait Liberation Medal (Saudi Arabia) | Kuwait Liberation Medal (Kuwait) |
