= ASW Continuous Trail Unmanned Vessel =

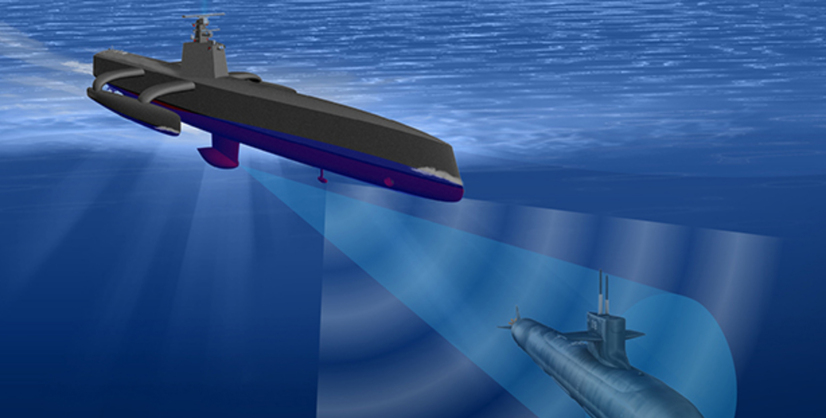
A rendering of the Continuous Trail Unmanned Vessel (ACTUV)

The ASW Continuous Trail Unmanned Vessel (ACTUV) is a DARPA funded project launched in early 2010 to develop an anti-submarine drone (unmanned surface vehicle). ASW is an acronym for Anti-Submarine Warfare. In January 2018 after successful sea trials it was announced that the "Sea Hunter" prototype has transitioned from DARPA to the Office of Naval Research for further development.

While the ACTUV program is focused on demonstrating the ASW tracking capability the core platform and autonomy technologies are broadly extendable to underpin a wide range of missions and configurations for future unmanned naval vessels.

The ACTUV will be "a first unmanned naval vessel that is designed and sized for theater or global independent deployment". The aim of the four part program is to develop a surface vessel optimized to overtly track and trail target submarines. A suite of sensors "capable of tracking quiet, modern diesel electric submarines" will be implemented into the completely unmanned vessel.

ACTUV will operate under minimal supervisory command and control; with shore bases intermittently monitoring performance and providing high-level mission objectives through beyond line-of-sight communications links. The vessel will be provided with advanced autonomous navigation and anti collision features to keep it within maritime law and the International Regulations for Preventing Collisions at Sea.

== History ==
In September 2014, DARPA signed a Memorandum of Agreement with the Office of Naval Research (ONR) to jointly fund the ACTUV prototype.

In March 2015 it was stated if the program was successful it could transition to the U.S. Navy for ASW by 2018, and possibly other missions such as mine countermeasures.

== Concept of operations ==
The ACTUV is aimed at improving the ability to detect and engage diesel-electric submarines, which are inexpensive and quieter in comparison to nuclear-powered submarines, and to negate the threat of adversaries building large numbers by creating anti-submarine tactics at one-tenth the cost of building a diesel submarine. Areas of operation are focused on littoral waters. The craft will be an unmanned surface vehicle (USV) designed to operate and patrol autonomously for 60–90 days straight, being able to hunt for targets and avoid surface ships by itself. It will operate alongside other naval assets including the P-8 Poseidon, MQ-4C Triton, and sonobuoy sensors as a forward deployed and rapid-response node in the global maritime surveillance network.

Once a wide-area sensor provides an initial indication of a possible target, the forward deployed ACTUV will then rapidly "sprint" to the area and use its own sensors to assess the contact. First, two side pods with long-range acquisition mid-frequency active-passive sonar will verify the presence of a submarine and identify the area of uncertainty (AOU) affected by the threat to limit close surface ships' movement. Second, two higher frequency sonars in the main hull will improve tracking precision and mission reliability. Once in close proximity, total field magnetometer arrays will provide additional information about target activity to continuously track it. Finally, very high frequency sonar will produce an "acoustic image" of the target to identify and classify the specific submarine.

The ACTUV is to be in constant contact with other ships and aircraft through a satellite link; if a contact is determined to not be threatening, a sailor can order the vessel go back on patrol. The craft itself is unarmed, so if an enemy submarine is detected it will notify other naval assets that can attack and destroy it. If deemed not a threat, the craft can still shadow the submarine to deter it from acting aggressively, potentially even back to its home port. The ACTUV is designed to out-endure any diesel-electric submarine, even those equipped with Air Independent Propulsion (AIP).

Using large numbers of inexpensive unmanned ACTUVs is a way to counter submarines as an undersea component of anti-access warfare. Some countries use "competitive strategies" to create cheap weaponry, hardware, and methods to impose on their adversaries a situation where they would need to incur costs of developing countermeasures that are disproportionately higher than the defenses they would be used against. The goal is to make the adversary decide the competition is unaffordable, or force them to redirect resources from other priorities. Countries building cheap diesel-electric submarines as anti-access components would be subjected to the same cost-benefit considerations they are trying to impose, as the U.S. Navy would be equipped with an even cheaper anti-submarine detection system.

In order to comply with International Regulations for Preventing Collisions at Sea (COLREGS), the ACTUV has to autonomously identify other surface ships at sea. Radar is the primary way to sense other ships, but it is not able to classify them. To augment radar, as well as reduce reliance on it, DARPA released a Request for Information (RFI) in March 2015 for other sensors for the ACTUV to perceive and classify nearby ships and other objects. Expected sensor systems and image-processing hardware and software include passive electro-optical/infrared (EO/IR) or non-radar active (LIDAR) technologies.

== Construction ==
After making Broad Agency Announcement (BAA), DARPA allowed the national security, health, and engineering company Leidos to go forward with the ACTUV program in February 2014. Using a USV for submarine hunting is aimed to free up other surface ships from needing to spend time and money looking for them themselves. Leidos' model is an unmanned trimaran built out of carbon composites equipped with navigation and piloting sensors, electro-optics, and long and short range radar to be capable of tracking diesel submarines at extreme depths for months at a time. The vessel is able to report back on the situation and its condition, and has computers programmed to identify other vessels to anticipate what they will do next. It uses a modular design that can be refitted for other roles such as intelligence, surveillance and reconnaissance missions.

Leidos announced on 18 November 2014 that a test vessel fitted with autonomy software and sensors to mimic the configuration of the ACTUV completed 42 days of at-sea demonstrations to fulfill collision regulations (COLREGS). The 32 ft (9.8 m) surrogate vessel simulated scenarios where the ACTUV prototype would interact with an interfering vessel, navigating through narrow channels while avoiding obstructions and other surface ships autonomously in completely unscripted events. Follow-on testing will involve multiple interfering contacts and adversarial behaviors of interfering vessels.

The company announced on 26 January 2015 that the ACTUV autonomy software had been successfully tested off the coast of Mississippi to test sensor, maneuvering, and mission functions. Installed on a 42 ft (13 m) work boat, the autonomy system navigated the complicated inshore environment of the Gulf Intracoastal Waterway using only a pre-loaded navigational chart and inputs from commercial-off-the-shelf (COTS) radars. The surrogate vessel traveled 35 nmi (40 mi; 65 km) while avoiding all obstacles, buoys, land, shoal water, and other vessels without pre-planned waypoints or human intervention. The first ACTUV, named Sea Hunter, was scheduled to launch in late fall 2015 and begin testing in the Columbia River.

By late October 2015, building of the ACTUV was 90 percent complete, with the hardware of the systems finished and the software being engineered. Testing of the command-and-control and navigation systems to enable the unmanned boat to operate safely in compliance with maritime safety standards "generally meets expectations." The vessel is 132 ft (40 m) long, weighs 140 tons, and is expected to cost $15,000–20,000 to operate per day, compared to $700,000 per day for a destroyer. Advantages of the vessel over ship-launched USVs are that it has greater payload and endurance, and it can launch and recover at a pier rather than needing integration with a manned ship. DARPA plans to conduct testing at Point Loma, San Diego. In November 2015, Raytheon delivered its Modular Scalable Sonar System (MS3) to be integrated onto the Leidos ACTUV. The MS3 is a fifth-generation hull-mounted sonar system that performs active and passive search and tracking, incoming torpedo warning, and small-object avoidance for safe navigation. In addition to submarine hunting, the vessel could perform counter-mine, reconnaissance, and resupply missions.

== Sea trials ==
DARPA launched the ACTUV technology demonstrator on 27 January 2016 at its construction site of Vigor Industrial in Portland, Oregon, and conducted local trials through February, achieving speeds of 27 knots (31 mph; 50 km/h). It allegedly had already successfully tracked a submarine from 1 kilometre (0.62 mi; 0.54 nmi) away. The vessel, named Sea Hunter, was commissioned on 7 April 2016 and sent to San Diego for a two-year trial period through September 2018, conducted by DARPA and ONR.

On 22 June 2016, Sea Hunter completed initial performance trials, meeting or surpassing all performance objectives for speed, maneuverability, stability, seakeeping, acceleration/deceleration, fuel consumption, and mechanical systems reliability in the open-ocean, in waters up to sea state 4. Initial sensor data from the performance trials will be analysed by Leidos to verify the proficiency of the vessel. Upcoming trials will include testing of sensors, the vessel's autonomy suite, compliance with maritime collision regulations, and proof-of-concept demonstrations for a variety of U.S. Navy missions.

In late October 2016, the ACTUV demonstrated another DARPA program, the Towed Airborne Lift of Naval Systems (TALONS), aimed at increasing ships' sensor capabilities by elevating them higher into the air using a parachute. For two days for 90 minutes each day, TALONS was deployed from a "nest" installed on the back of the ACTUV vehicle, rising to 1,000 ft (300 m) while the ship maneuvered at "operationally realistic speeds." Compared to mast-mounted sensors sitting 150–200 ft (46–61 m) above the waterline, the parasailing sensor array increased surface-track radar range by six times, doubled its EO/IR discrimination range, and more than tripled omnidirectional radio range.

Operational testing began off the coast of San Diego in late November 2016 after initial autonomy capability testing in summer, where the ship successfully executed a multi-waypoint mission without a person directing course or speed changes. A test of the Remote Supervisory Control Station (RSCS), which allows remote supervisory control of the vessel and new mission tasking from a remote afloat or ashore location was also conducted.
