= Christensen Shipyards =

American yacht builder

Christensen Shipyards Inc.
- Company type: Private company
- Headquarters: Vancouver, Washington, U.S.
- Number of locations: Vancouver, Washington; Knoxville, Tennessee
- Products: Yachts, wind turbines, tidal power

Christensen Shipyards was a builder of composite-hull motor yachts located in Vancouver, Washington, United States.

== Facilities ==
Founded in 1983, the original yard was located on a 7-acre (2.8 ha) marina, containing 180,000 square feet (17,000 m^{2}) of climate controlled manufacturing space. Sister company RECS (Renewable Energy Composite Solutions) occupied 10,000 square feet (930 m^{2}), manufacturing wind turbine and hydrokinetic composite component fabrication.

In 2012, the company began construction of a 450,000 square feet (42,000 m^{2}) climate controlled manufacturing facility on Tellico Lake, close to Knoxville, Tennessee, capable of construction of yachts of over 200 feet (61 m) in composite or steel. To this date this building has not been completed and sits unfinished.

Christensen's Vancouver facility was purchased by Portland-based Vigor Industrial in 2019. The last yacht at Christensen's Vancouver facility was completed in June 2019.

== Vessels ==
=== Hull 026 Privacy ===
Hull 026 was delivered to golfer Tiger Woods in summer 2006. It was specified by Woods, but owner-checked and with interior colour schemes chosen by his then fiancee Elin Nordegren, the 155 feet (47 m) yacht was registered in the Cayman Islands as Privacy. The $20 million, 6,500 square feet (600 m^{2}) vessel features a master suite, six staterooms, a theatre, gym, and Jacuzzi, and sleeps 21 people. During ordering and construction, the yacht was covered by a strict non-disclosure agreement, meaning that details of the yacht specification and owner would not be released. After details leaked to various nautical publications and later gossip columns, Woods successfully sued Christensen, and reached an out of court settlement. Woods used the yacht as accommodation at some golf tournaments, but placed it on the market after his divorce in 2011.

=== Sea Hunter ===
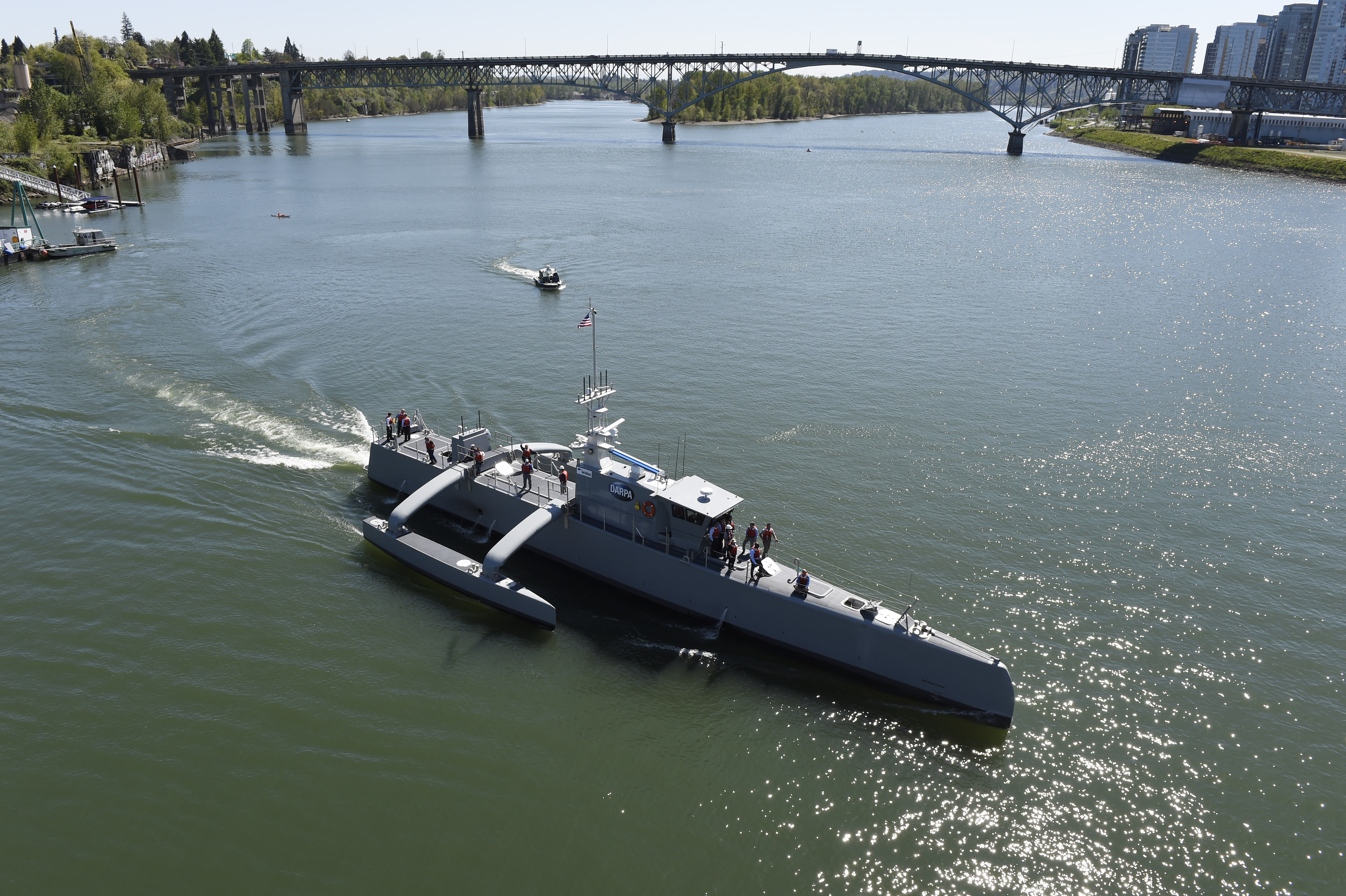
Sea Hunter on the Willamette River after its christening ceremony in 2016

In 2012 Christensen was contracted by Leidos to manufacture the Sea Hunter unmanned surface vessel under the supervision of Oregon Iron Works. When Christensen went into receivership work on the vessel stopped and the incomplete hull had to be transferred to Vigor Industrial (parent of Oregon Iron Works) for completion.
