= Ghost Fleet Overlord =

US navy fleet of test unmanned surface vehicles

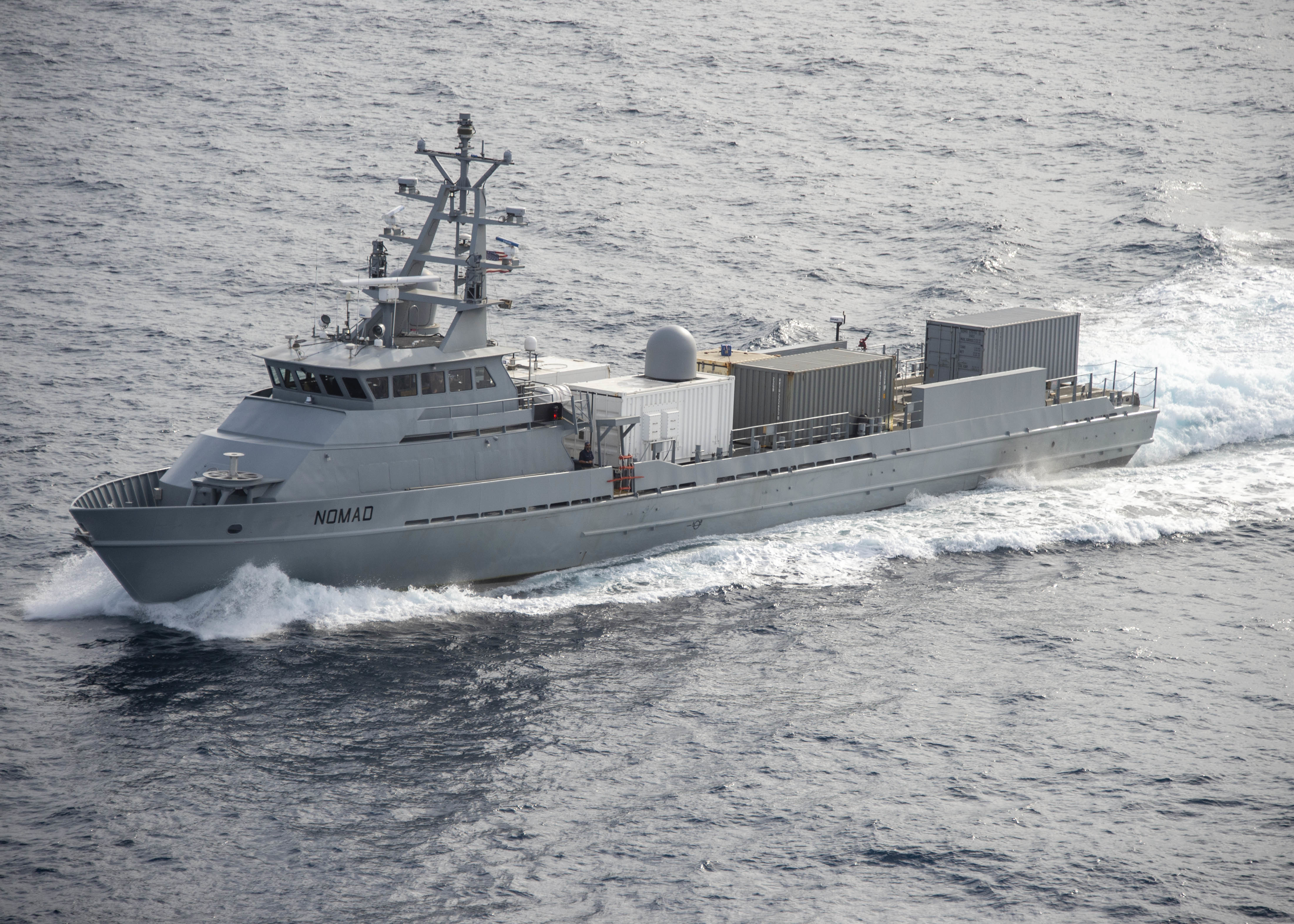
The unmanned surface vessel USV Nomad transiting the Pacific as part of RIMPAC 2022.

Ghost Fleet Overlord is a fleet of test unmanned surface vehicles operated by the U.S. Navy.

Ghost Fleet Overlord is being developed by the Department of Defense’s Strategic Capabilities Office. It is a partnership between the War Department's Strategic Capabilities Office and the Navy.

== Vessels ==
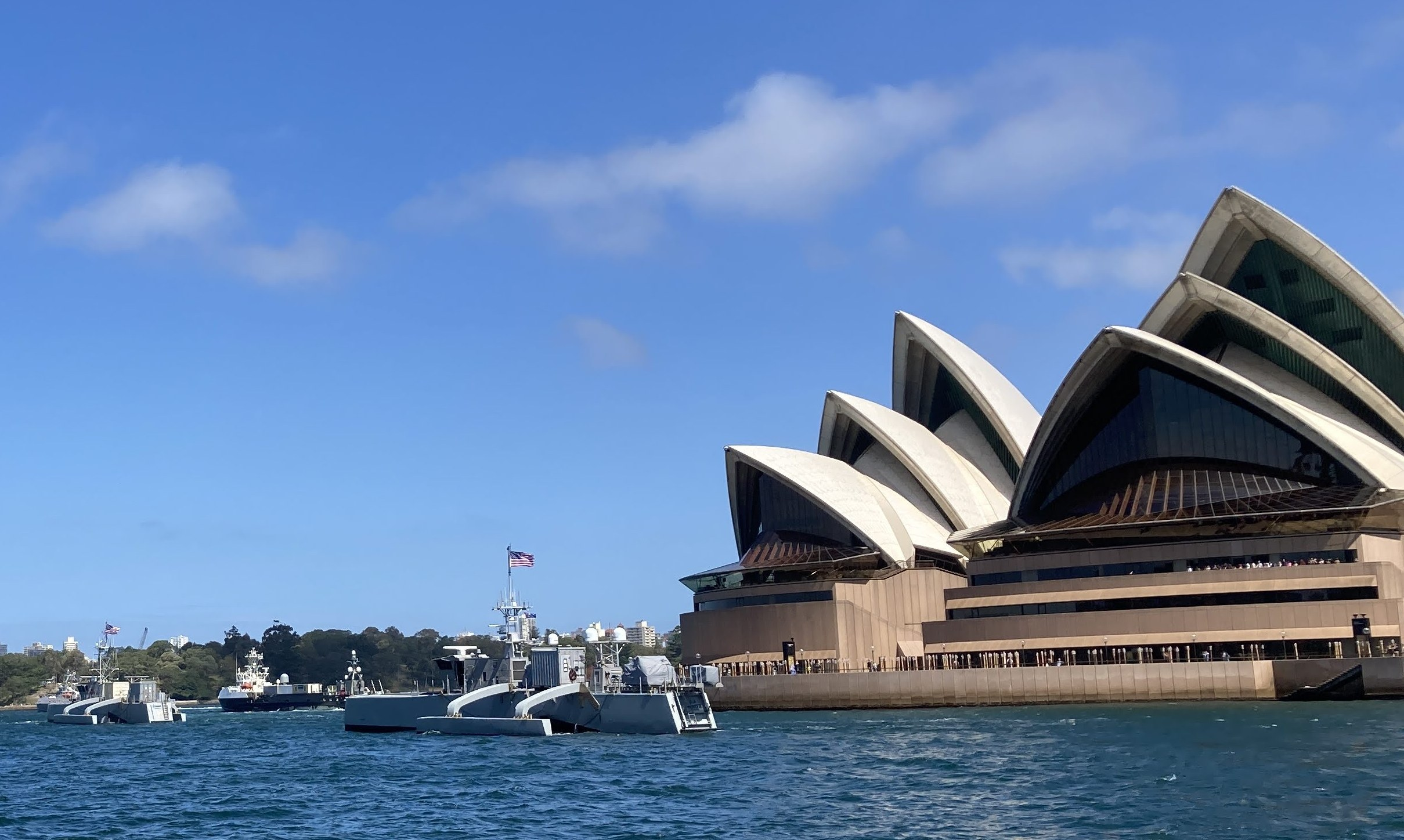
Ghost Fleet Overlord ships passing the Sydney Opera House in November 2023

As of January 2024, the fleet consisted of three ships delivered and one under construction. The first was USV Ranger, the second was USV Nomad and the third was USV Mariner. The fourth will be USV Vanguard, launched on January 15, 2024 but not yet delivered. Later in 2024, USV Nomad, a converted fast support vessel, was sold by the Navy for $2.11 million and returned to commercial service.

While technically "uncrewed", the ships carry a crew of six human sailors. Most of the ship's functions are automated, but can be carried out manually by the onboard human crew if the need arises.

== Weapons ==
USV Mariner is outfitted with next-generation command and control systems and a virtualised Aegis Combat System. Its test will help in putting combat systems on Large Unmanned Surface Vehicles.

== See also ==
- Sea Hunter
- JARI USV
