= October 1916 =

Month in 1916

<<	October 1916					>>
Su	Mo	Tu	We	Th	Fr	Sa
1	2	3	4	5	6	7
8	9	10	11	12	13	14
15	16	17	18	19	20	21
22	23	24	25	26	27	28
29	30	31

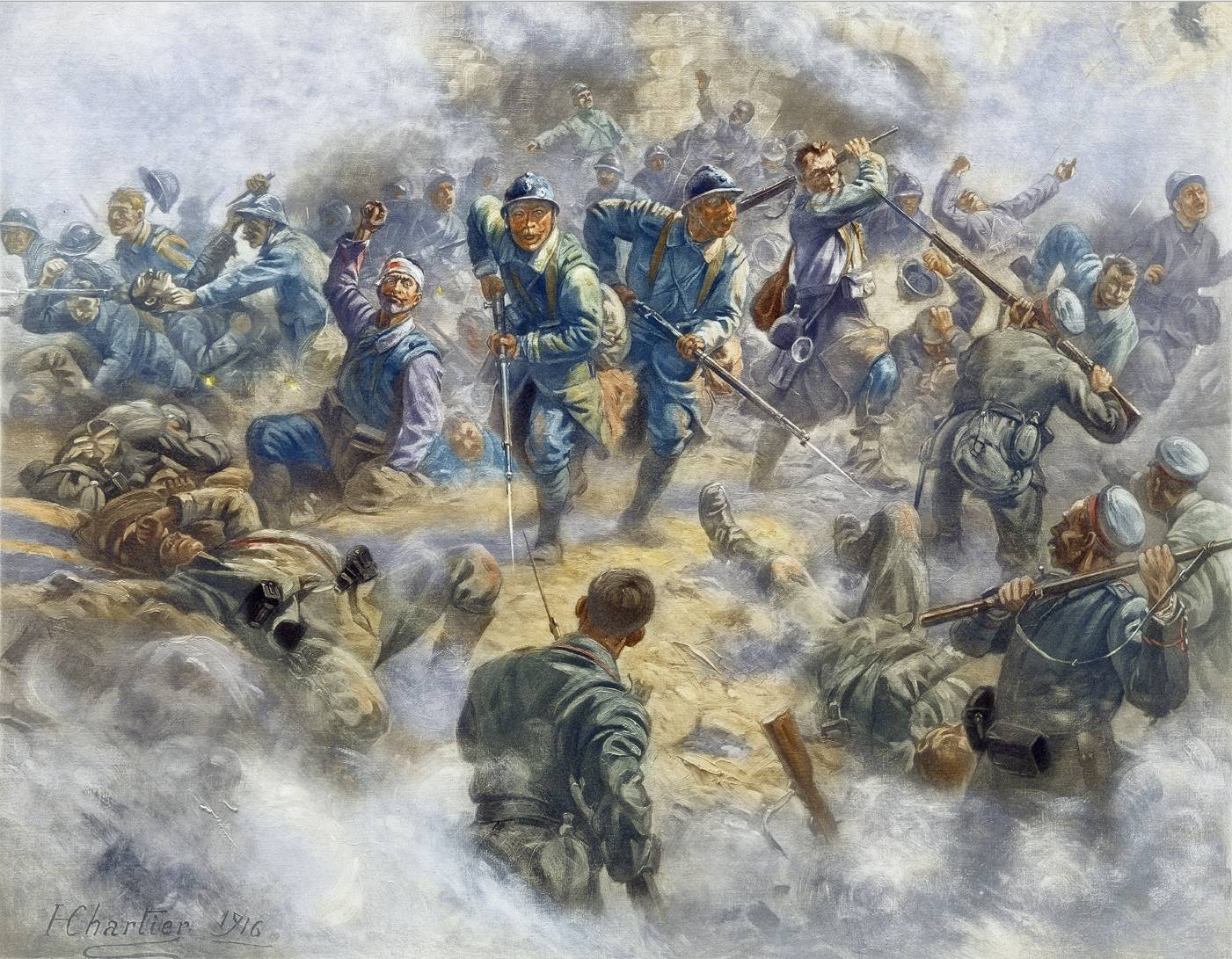
French infantry recapturing Douaumont during the Battle of Verdun.

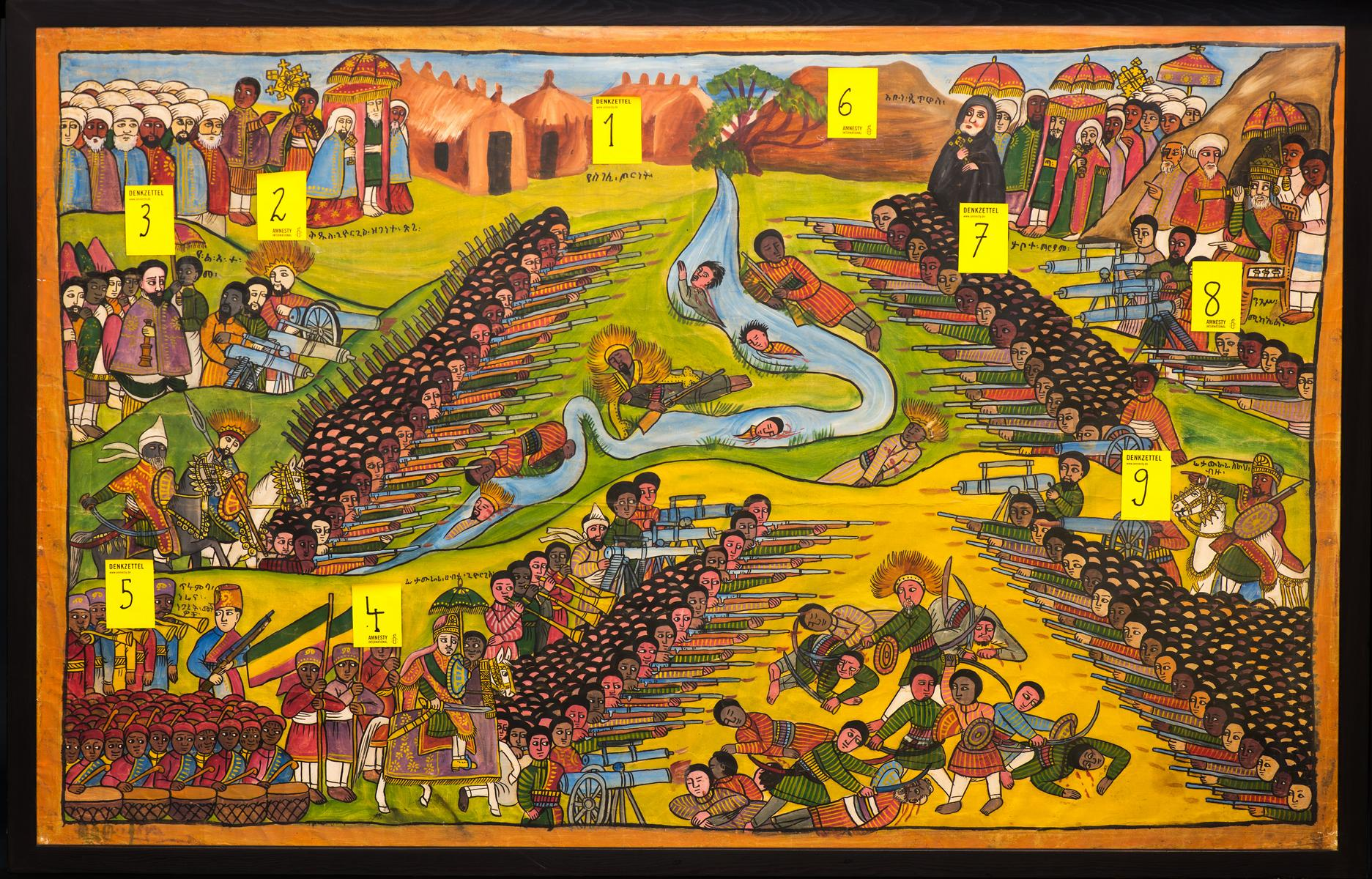
Palace Coup against Emperor Iyasu of Ethiopia

The following events occurred in October 1916:

== October 1, 1916 (Sunday) ==
- Battle of Le Transloy – The British Fourth Army launched its final offensive in the Battle of the Somme with an attack to capture the German-held commune of Le Transloy, France.
- Battle of the Ancre Heights – The British Reserve Army attacked German defenses along the Ancre River in northeastern France in a continuation of the Battle of Thiepval Ridge. The 2nd Canadian Division attacked and briefly held the strategically important German line named Regina Trench that ran northwest of the village of Le Sars, France.
- Flămânda Offensive – Romanian forces crossed the Danube River and established a bridgehead at Flămânda (then part of Macedonia).
- Eleven German Navy Zeppelins raided England, but most failed to reach their targets, with only one British soldier reported as a casualty. Royal Flying Corps Second Lieutenant W. J. Tempest in a Royal aircraft shot down airship L 31 outside London, killing its entire crew, including the famed airship commander Heinrich Mathy who leaped to his death from the burning Zeppelin.
- The Royal Flying Corps established the No. 75 Squadron.
- Dublin Mean Time, which was 25 minutes behind Greenwich Mean Time, was made the same as British time at 2:00 a.m. under terms of the Time Ireland Act for Ireland.
- The Perth Amboy Technical High School opened in Perth Amboy, New Jersey.
- The London Underground extended the Bakerloo line with a new tube station at Kensal Green.
- Born: Tibor Reich, Hungarian-British designer, known for his celebrated textile designs including deep texture weaves in the 1950s; in Budapest, Austria-Hungary (present-day Hungary) (d. 1996)
- Died:
  - James Paul Clarke, 62, American politician, 18th Governor of Arkansas (b. 1854)
  - Ivan Dumbadze, 65, Russian army officer, military and civil head of Yalta, Major-General of Svita for Nicholas II of Russia (b. 1851)
  - Galusha Pennypacker, American army officer, youngest general appointed to the Union Army during the American Civil War, recipient of the Medal of Honor for action at the Second Battle of Fort Fisher (b. 1844)
  - Alexander Russell Webb, 69, American diplomat, United States Ambassador to the Philippines in 1887 when he converted to Islam, author of The Three Lectures (b. 1846)

== October 2, 1916 (Monday) ==
- Battle of the Ancre Heights – British forces assaulted the German north side of Schwaben Redoubt, a strategically important defensive landmark on the Ancre River in France. Meanwhile, the Germans wrested control of the Regina Trench back from Canadian forces.
- Flămânda Offensive – The Austro-Hungarian Navy contested the Romanian bridgehead on the Danube River. Romanian torpedo boats SMS Bodrog and SMS Körös engaged by the enemy ships but coast batteries disabled the Badrog while Körös was forced by enemy fire to the shore where it ran aground.
- The Zoological Society of San Diego was founded by physician Harry M. Wegeforth to address the issue of abandoned exotic animals from the Panama–California Exposition. Efforts to secure and care for these animals led to the establishment of the San Diego Zoo in Balboa Park, San Diego in 1922.
- The Gotha G.I aircraft was retired by the Imperial German Navy as its design was outdated and newer Allied planes were faster and more maneuverable.
- Schenley High School opened to students in Pittsburgh. The school building is now listed in the National Register of Historic Places.
- Born: Bob Powell, American comic book artist, best known for the Mars Attacks trading card series and artwork for Sheena, Queen of the Jungle and Mr. Mystic; as Stanley Robert Pawlowski, in Buffalo, New York, United States (d. 1967)
- Died: Benjamin Kidd, 58, British sociologist, author of Social Evolution (b. 1858)

== October 3, 1916 (Tuesday) ==
- Battle of Le Transloy – British forces captured the farms of Eaucourt l'Abbaye in northeastern France.
- Flămânda Offensive – Romanian commander Alexandru Averescu called off the offensive as word arrived the situation was deteriorating in Transylvania and reinforcements were needed.
- Bayonne refinery strike – Thousands of workers joined a core group of 36 pressmen in a strike against Standard Oil at its refinery in Bayonne, New Jersey.
- The Von Bissing university was established in Ghent, Belgium.
- Born:
  - James Herriot, English writer and veterinary surgeon, best known for the BBC comedy TV series All Creatures Great and Small adapted from his books; as James Alfred Wight, in Sunderland, England (d. 1995)
  - Bernard Smith, Australian historian, leading expert on the history of Australian art; in Balmain, New South Wales, Australia (d. 2011)
  - María de los Ángeles Alvariño González, Spanish marine biologist, leading authority on plankton biology and first woman appointed to science officer on British and Spanish sea expeditions; in Ferrol, Spain (d. 2005)
  - Russell W. Peterson, American politician, 66th Governor of Delaware; as Russell Wilbur Peterson, in Portage, Wisconsin, United States (d. 2011)
  - Frank Pantridge, Irish physician, developed the portable defibrillator; as James Francis Pantridge, in Hillsborough, County Down, Ireland (d. 2004)

== October 4, 1916 (Wednesday) ==
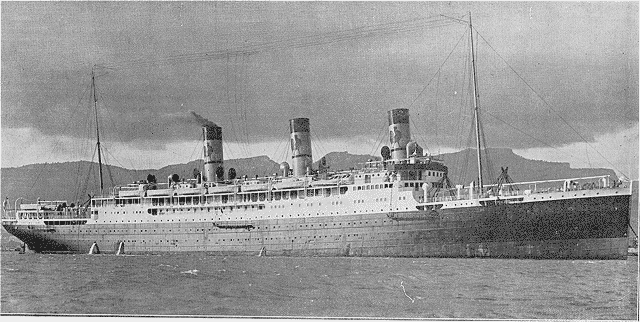
SS Gallia in 1913

- French troopship SS Gallia was torpedoed and sunk in the Mediterranean Sea by German U-boat SM U-35 with the loss of 1,338 of the approximately 2,000 crew on board.
- Flămânda Offensive – Romania retreated across the Danube River, allowing the Austro-Hungarian Navy to return to port.
- Senussi campaign – An Allied column was dispatched to the Dakhla Oasis in North Africa where a reported camp of 1,800 Senussi was located.
- British ocean liner RMS Franconia was torpedoed and sunk in the Mediterranean Sea by German submarine SM UB-47 with the loss of twelve of her 314 crew.
- Ross Sea party – Joseph Stenhouse, first officer and interim captain of the British polar exploration ship Aurora for the second arm of the Imperial Trans-Antarctic Expedition, was replaced by Captain John King Davis prior to the return voyage to Antarctica and the rescue of 10 expedition members marooned onshore after the ship the previous year lost anchor and drifted in the ice.
- The city of Murmansk was established above the Arctic Circle, the last city founded by the Russian Empire.
- Born:
  - Vitaly Ginzburg, Russian physicist, recipient of the Nobel Prize in Physics, one of the developers of the hydrogen bomb in the Soviet Union; in Moscow, Russian Empire (present-day Russia) (d. 2009)
  - Ronald Cuthbert Hay, Scottish marine fighter ace, recipient of the Distinguished Service Order and Distinguished Service Cross; in Perth, Scotland (d. 2001)
  - Anton Rupert, South African business executive, established the Rembrandt Group; as Anthony Edward Rupert, in Graaff-Reinet, South Africa (d. 2006)

== October 5, 1916 (Thursday) ==
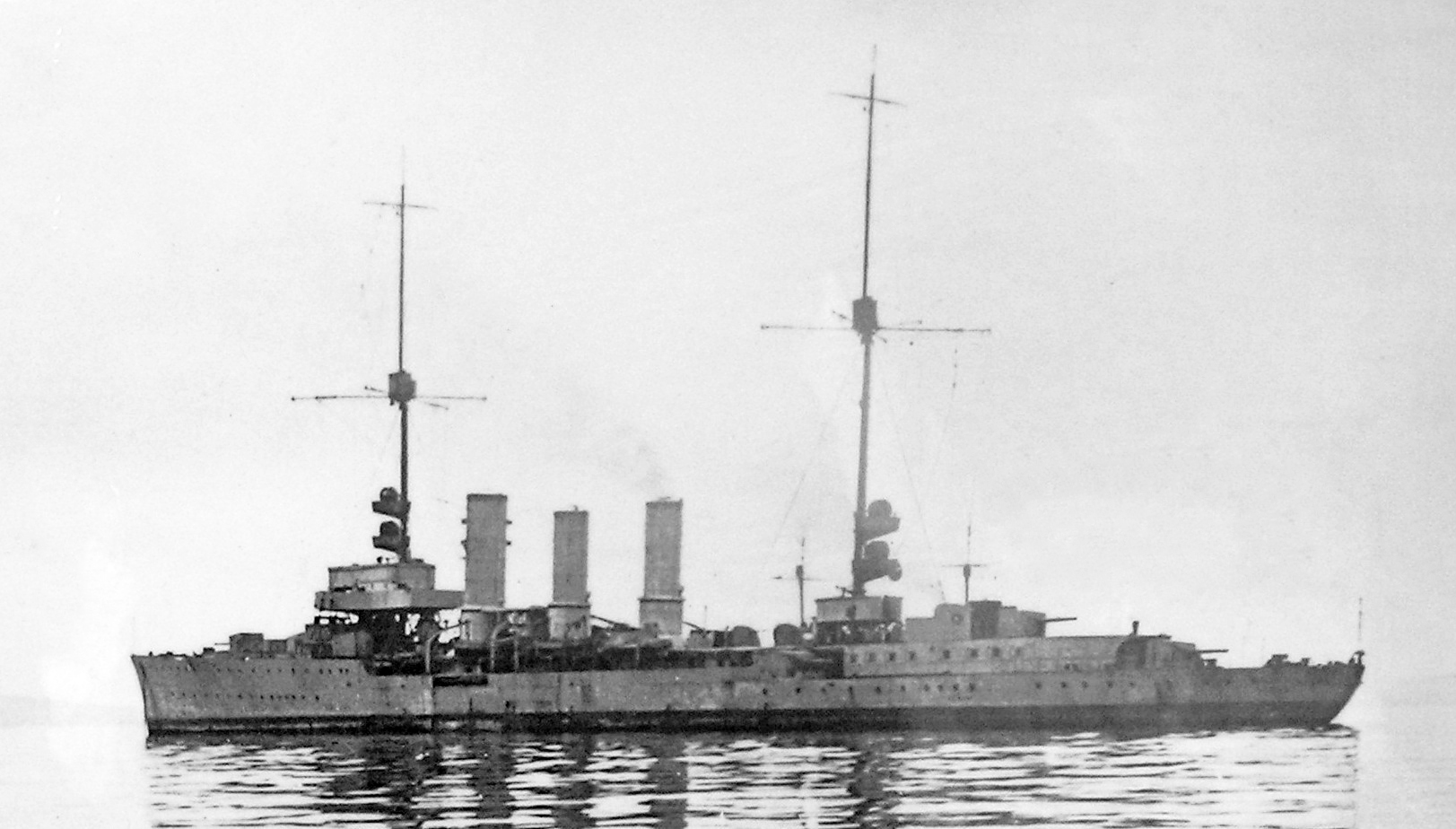
SMS Cöln

- Battle of the Crna Bend – A Bulgarian army of 26,000 troops defended the Crna River in Macedonia against Allied forces composed of French, Russian and Serbian soldiers. The Serbians attempted to cross the river but were beaten back by Bulgarian counter-assaults.
- The Italian government was informed of the content of the agreement signed in May between France, the United Kingdom and Russia for the partition of the Asian part of the Ottoman Empire. Italy advanced reservations about the agreement and demanded that part of Asia Minor, including the Turkish provinces of Aidin (Smyrna), Konya and Adana, would be allocated to them as agreed in the Treaty of London.
- German light cruiser SMS Cöln was launched at Blohm & Voss shipyard in Hamburg as a replacement for her sister ship SMS Cöln which was lost at the Battle of Heligoland Bight in 1914.
- British aviation pioneer George Holt Thomas registered Aircraft Transport and Travel in anticipation of commercial aviation growing after World War I. The company would be the first to operate a London-Paris airline service in 1919.
- Born:
  - Roy Conacher, Canadian hockey player, played left wing for the Boston Bruins, Detroit Red Wings and Chicago Black Hawks from 1938 to 1951; in Toronto, Canada (d. 1984)
  - Stetson Kennedy, American journalist, best known for his exposé I Rode With The Ku Klux Klan; as William Stetson Kennedy, in Jacksonville, Florida, United States (d. 2011)

== October 6, 1916 (Friday) ==
- Battle of the Crna Bend – Bulgarian forces repulsed a second Serbian attack at the villages of Dobroveni and Skochivir on the Crna River in Macedonia, while capturing the village of Brod.
- By some accounts, the Dada movement in art, poetry and literature coalesced on this date at a cabaret, where artists Emmy Hennings, Tristan Tzara, Jean Arp, Richard Huelsenbeck, Sophie Täuber and others discussed art and put on performances expressing their disgust with World War I and the interests they believed inspired it.
- Born:
  - Chiang Wei-kuo, Chinese army officer, president of the Republic of China Army from 1963 to 1968, Secretary-General of the National Security Council of Taiwan, adopted son of Chiang Kai-shek; in Tokyo, Empire of Japan (present-day Japan) (d. 1997)
  - Stanley Ellin, American writer, best known for his mystery short stories including "The Specialty of the House"; in New York City, United States (d. 1986)
  - Ulysses Guimarães, Brazilian politician, member of the Chamber of Deputies from 1951 to 1962, leading opposition to the military dictatorship in Brazil from the 1960s to 1980s; in Itirapina, Brazil (d. 1992)
- Died: Isidore De Loor, 35, Belgian clergy, assisted cancer patients during World War I despite being stricken by the disease himself, beatified by Pope John Paul II in 1984 (b. 1881)

== October 7, 1916 (Saturday) ==
- Battle of Le Transloy – British forces captured the French commune of Le Sars from the Germans, while at the same time launched attacks on the Butte de Warlencourt burial mound northeast of the commune.
- Battle of the Ancre Heights – German forces tried to push British troops off the south side of Schwaben Redoubt and reclaim all of their strategic defensive landmark lost prior in the Battle of Thiepval Ridge.
- The football match between Georgia Tech and Cumberland College ended in a score of 222–0, the most one-sided game in American college football history.
- The Taronga Zoo in Sydney was established, being the first major zoo designed with no cages for animals.
- Born:
  - Manuel Azcárate, Spanish politician, leader of the Communist Party of Spain; as Manuel Azcárate Diz, in Madrid, Spain (d. 1998)
  - John Horne Burns, American writer, author of The Gallery and other novels; in Andover, Massachusetts, United States (d. 1953)
  - Walt Whitman Rostow, American economist, developed the Rostow's stages of growth for economics, National Security Adviser from 1966 to 1969; in New York City, United States (d. 2003)
- Died:
  - Philip Howell, 38, British army officer, chief of staff for the British Fifth Army; killed in action at the Battle of the Somme (b. 1877)
  - Leigh Richmond Roose, 38, Welsh rugby player, goalkeeper for the Wales national football team from 1900 to 1911, and several clubs in the English Football League from 1900 to 1912; killed in action at the Battle of the Somme (b. 1877)

== October 8, 1916 (Sunday) ==
- Battle of the Ancre Heights – British forces assaulted Stuff Redoubt, an important fortification for the German Second Army.
- Battle of Le Transloy – Bad weather slowed the British advance, allowing them to consolidate their positions north of Le Sars, France.
- Senussi campaign – Senussi supreme leader Ahmed Sharif as-Senussi received advanced warning of a British armored column moving towards the Dakhla Oasis in North Africa where most of his men were camped. As disease and hunger made most of his men too weak to fight, Sayed Ahmed ordered his force to retreat to the Siwa Oasis.
- The Imperial German Flying Corps was reorganized and renamed the German Air Force (Luftstreitkräfte).
- Born:
  - Spark Matsunaga, American politician, U.S. Senator from Hawaii from 1977 to 1990; as Masayuki Matsunaga, in Kauai, Territory of Hawaii, United States (present-day Hawaii) (d. 1990)
  - A. Peter Dewey, American journalist, first American fatality during the 1945 War in Vietnam; as Albert Peter Dewey, in Chicago, United States (d. 1945)
  - Frank Filchock, American football coach, coached for National Football League and Canadian Football League, famously suspended from coaching following the 1946 NFL Championship Game due to alleged bribery; in Crucible, Pennsylvania, United States (d. 1994)
- Died: Nielsine Nielsen, 66, Danish physician, first woman to practice medicine in Denmark (b. 1850)

== October 9, 1916 (Monday) ==
- Battle of the Ancre Heights – The 1st Canadian Division attacked and failed to recapture the strategically important Regina Trench from the Germans, with a loss of 770 casualties out of 1,100 men.
- The Imperial German Army dissolved the 12th Army after transferring its commander Max von Fabeck to the 8th Army.
- Born:
  - Bill Allum, Canadian hockey player, played defense for the New York Rangers and Chicago Blackhawks, coached the Winnipeg Braves to winning the 1959 Memorial Cup; as William James Douglas Allum, in Winnipeg, Canada (d. 1992)
  - Charles N. Millican, American academic, first president of Florida Technological University (now University of Central Florida); in Wilson, Arkansas, United States (d. 2010)
  - Harold Robert Perry, American clergy, first African American to serve as Catholic bishop for the Roman Catholic Archdiocese of New Orleans in 1965; in Lake Charles, Louisiana, United States (d. 1991)
- Died: Robert Donston Stephenson, 75, English journalist, one of the suspects in the Jack the Ripper murders who also developed a theory the serial killer was motivated by the occult (b. 1841)

== October 10, 1916 (Tuesday) ==
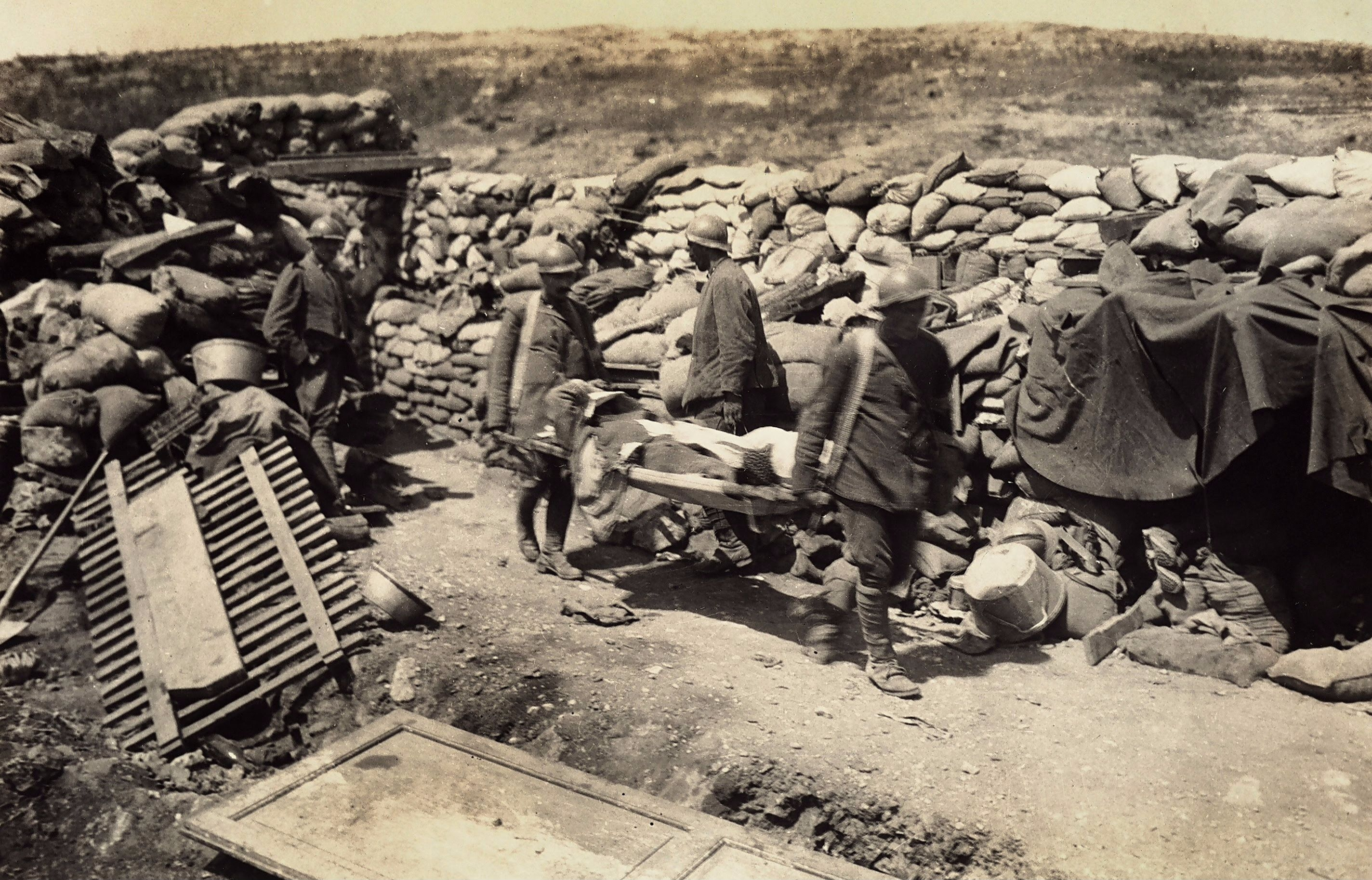
Wounded Italian soldiers being transferred.

- Eighth Battle of the Isonzo – The Italians continued to establish their bridgehead at Gorizia on the border of Italy and Austria-Hungary from the Seventh Battle of the Isonzo.
- Battle of the Ancre Heights – British forces claimed the northwest portion Stuff Redoubt from the Germans.
- Bayonne refinery strike – Striking refinery workers in Bayonne, New Jersey charged a police line where shots were exchanged, injuring three police officers and eight strikers.
- Japanese politician Katō Takaaki established Kenseikai, a conservative political party from the merger of three other political organizations, allowing it to gain 198 seats and a majority in the Lower House of the National Diet in Japan.
- The first PGA Championship was held at the Siwanoy Country Club in Bronxville, New York, with 32 golfers competing.
- Born: Bernard Heuvelmans, French biologist, considered "the father of cryptozoology", author of On the Track of Unknown Animals; in Le Havre, France (d. 2001)

== October 11, 1916 (Wednesday) ==
- Battle of the Ancre Heights – German forces counterattacked to reclaim portions of the strategically important Stuff Redoubt on the Western Front.
- Bayonne refinery strike – A mob of 500 strikers lay siege to a police station in Bayonne, New Jersey in retaliation to police shooting into the picket line the previous day, as well as looting several saloons.
- Born:
  - Antoni Heda, Polish military commander, one of the leaders of the Polish resistance movement in World War II and lead the Raid on Kielce Prison during Soviet occupation in 1945; in Małomierzyce, Poland (d. 2008)
  - Nanaji Deshmukh, Indian activist, founder of the Bharatiya Jana Sangh political party and recipient of the Padma Vibhushan; as Chandikadas Amritrao Deshmukh, in Maharashtra, British India (present-day India) (d. 2010)
  - Torsten Hägerstrand, Swedish geographer, leading researcher into trans-cultural diffusion and cultural geography; in Moheda, Sweden (d. 2004)
- Died: King Otto of Bavaria, 68, German noble, monarch of Bavaria from 1886 to 1913 (b. 1848)

== October 12, 1916 (Thursday) ==
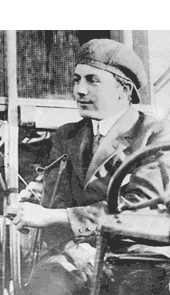
Aviator Tony Jannus, killed in a crash

- Eighth Battle of the Isonzo – The battle for Gorizia ended inconclusively with both the Italians and Austro-Hungarians each sustaining 25,000 casualties.
- Hipólito Yrigoyen was elected President of Argentina, ending decades of Conservative government.
- Battle of Le Transloy – British attacks failed to push the German line back, although the offence was now taking a serious toll on the Germans. One of its worst hit infantry units lost 1,177 casualties in 10 days of fighting and was reduced to 350 infantry.
- Battle of the Ancre Heights – German forces were pushed back on Stuff Redoubt to a holdout position known at the Mounds of the northwest side of the landmark.
- Bayonne refinery strike – Violence from looting in Bayonne, New Jersey continued the next day, resulting in seven more shootings that included the death of one bystander.
- Canadian Royal Naval Air Service flying ace Raymond Collishaw claimed his first victory.
- American aviation pioneer Tony Jannus and two crewmen were killed near Sevastopol in the Russian Empire when the Curtiss flying boat he was using to train Russian pilots had engine problems and crashed into the Black Sea.
- Boston Red Sox defeated the Brooklyn Robins by four games to one to win the World Series.
- Association football Club América was established in Mexico City, after two college teams consolidated into one club.
- The Estádio Urbano Caldeira association football stadium opened in Santos, São Paulo, Brazil as the home field for Santos.
- Born: Alice Childress, American actress and children's writer, author of Like One of the Family and A Hero Ain't Nothin' but a Sandwich; as Alice Herndon, in Charleston, South Carolina, United States (d. 1994)
- Died: Donald Hankey, 31, British army officer, best known for his essays on military life in A Student in Arms; killed in action at the Battle of the Somme (b. 1884)

== October 13, 1916 (Friday) ==
- Anglo-Egyptian Darfur Expedition – Anglo-Egyptian forces occupied the Sudanese village of Dibbis, forcing rebel leader Sultan Ali Dinar of the Sultanate of Darfur to re-open talks with British commander Philip James Vandeleur Kelly. Talks failed sooner after and Dinar went back into hiding.
- Bayonne refinery strike – Police in Bayonne, New Jersey were finally able to quell the riots after 10 days of unrest.
- Born: Howard Biggs, American jazz musician, pianist for The Five Keys, The Ravens and The Silhouettes, considered one of the innovators of the doo-wop genre; in Seattle, United States (d. 1999)

== October 14, 1916 (Saturday) ==
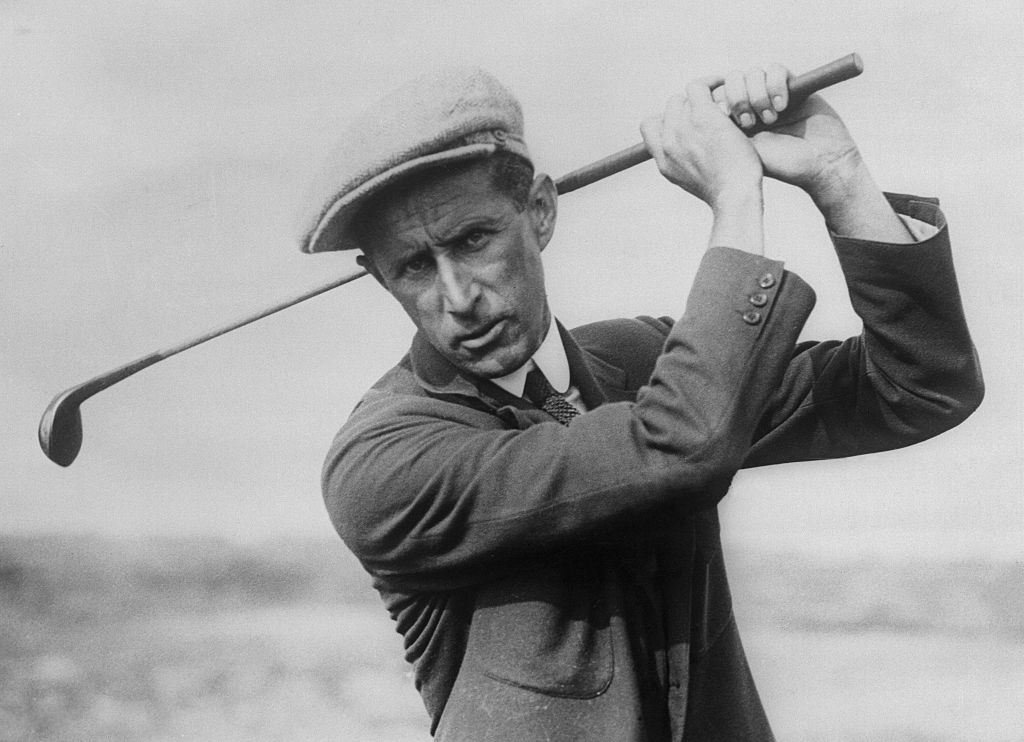
Golfer Jim Barnes, first PGA champion

- Romanian Campaign – Romanian forces were sent to help a civilian force led by Ecaterina Teodoroiu to defend a bridge from German commandos that connected the city of Târgu Jiu across the Jiu River in Romania.
- Battle of the Ancre Heights – British forces occupied the entire Schwaben Redoubt and Stuff Redoubt. The Germans now lost two of their most important defensive positions on the Ancre River in France.
- Battle of the Crna Bend – Serbian forces continued to wear down Bulgarian defenses on the Crna River in Macedonia.
- Royal Navy destroyer HMS Rosalind was launched by John I. Thornycroft & Company at Southampton, England.
- Perm State University was founded in Perm, Russia.
- British golfer Jim Barnes became the first PGA champion, beating Jock Hutchison by one stroke in the finals.
- Born:
  - C. Everett Koop, American surgeon, 13th Surgeon General of the United States; as Charles Everett Koop, in New York City, United States (d. 2013)
  - Jack Arnold, American film director, best known for his science fiction films in the 1950s including It Came from Outer Space, Creature from the Black Lagoon and The Incredible Shrinking Man; as John Arnold Waks, in New Haven, Connecticut, United States (d. 1992)
  - Andrew Mynarski, Canadian fighter pilot, member of the famous 419 "Moose" Squadron, recipient of the Victoria Cross and last Canadian airman to receive it during World War II; in Winnipeg, Canada (killed in action, 1944)
  - Patrick Wall, British politician, Member of Parliament from 1954 to 1987, member of the 47 Commando during World War II (d. 1998)
- Died: William Lightfoot Price, 54, American architect, pioneer in using reinforced concrete, founder of the communities of Rose Valley, Pennsylvania and Arden, Delaware (b. 1861)

== October 15, 1916 (Sunday) ==
- Battle of the Crna Bend – The Serbs launched eight successive night attacks on Bulgarian defenses on the Crna River in Macedonia but were forced back each time.
- Battle of the Ancre Heights – German forces launched three successive assaults to recapture Schwaben Redoubt from the British but failed each time.
- The Latvian Riflemen Battalion Museum was established in Riga but was renamed the Latvian War Museum when the site was restored in 1990 after decades of being closed by the Soviet Union.
- Born:
  - George T. Smith, American politician and judge, 6th Lieutenant Governor of Georgia and justice for the Supreme Court of Georgia from 1981 to 1991; in Mitchell County, Georgia, United States (d. 2010)
  - Leonard Thornton, New Zealand army officer, commander of the 2nd New Zealand Division during World War II; in Christchurch, New Zealand (d. 1999)
- Died: Norman Prince, 29, American air force officer, founder of the Lafayette Escadrille, recipient of the Legion of Honour (b. 1887)

== October 16, 1916 (Monday) ==
- The Senate of the Philippines was established as the upper house of the Congress of the Philippines.
- Arab Revolt – T. E. Lawrence was sent on an intelligence-gathering mission led by Ronald Storrs to the Hejaz region in the Middle East, where he met Sharif Hussein bin Ali's three sons Ali, Abdullah, and Faisal. There, Lawrence concluded Faisal would be the best leader to take command of the revolt.
- Margaret Sanger opened a family planning and birth control clinic in Brownsville, Brooklyn, the first of its kind in the United States.
- The Provincial Institute of Technology and Art was established in Calgary, eventually expanding to become the Southern Alberta Institute of Technology.
- Philtrust Bank was established as the third bank in the Philippines.
- The No. 4 Squadron was established at Point Cook, Victoria, Australia as a unit of the Australian Flying Corps.
- The German air squadron Jagdstaffel 16 was established in the Luftstreitkräfte.
- Born: Louise Day Hicks, American politician, U.S. Representative from Massachusetts from 1971 to 1973 and President of Boston City Council in 1976; as Anna Louise Day, in Boston, United States (d. 2003)

== October 17, 1916 (Tuesday) ==
- Battle of Transylvania – Germany defeated Romania at Brașov, forcing the outnumbered Romanians to retreat back to the Carpathian Mountains.
- Battle of Le Transloy – A British tank annihilated German defenses around the Butte de Warlencourt burial mound northeast of Le Sars, France, but infantry were held off a day for occupation.
- Senussi Campaign – A British armored column arrived at the Dakhla Oasis in North Africa only to find it abandoned by the Senussi, save for 120 tribesmen who were taken prisoner.
- Italian Navy destroyer Nembo sunk Austro-Hungarian submarine U-16 with the loss of 11 of the 13 on board.
- The Pisgah National Forest was established in western North Carolina.
- British soldier Harry Farr was executed for cowardice despite his claims to army medical doctors that he was suffering from severe hearing loss (a symptom his family later deemed to be shell shock). He was pardoned in 2006 as part of the Armed Forces Act which gave over 300 pardons for soldiers who were court-martial-ed over command's misunderstanding of combat-related health issues.
- The association football Club Sportivo Alsina was established in Valentín Alsina, Buenos Aires, Argentina under the name "El Aeroplano", and would be changed to its present name in 1922.
- Born:
  - Harold G. Schrier, American marine officer, led the U.S. Marines unit to raise the American flag on Iwo Jima following the World War II battle, recipient of the Navy Cross and Silver Star; in Corder, Missouri, United States (d. 1971)
  - Tadeusz Chciuk-Celt, Polish resistance fighter and journalist, broadcaster for Radio Free Europe, author of By Parachute to Warsaw; in Drohobych, Austria-Hungary (present-day Ukraine) (d. 2001)
- Died: Ras Lul Seged, Ethiopian military leader, army commander under Emperor Menelik II (killed in battle at Ankober) (date of birth unknown)

== October 18, 1916 (Wednesday) ==
- Battle of the Somme – British casualties for the Fourth Army by October were 57,722, while the French endured 37,626. German casualties were 78,500.
- Battle of the Crna Bend – After nearly two weeks of fighting, Serbian forces finally established at bridgehead on the other side of the Crna River in Macedonia, east of the Bulgarian-held village of Brod.
- Battle of Le Transloy – German machine-gun nests halted British forces from further advancing beyond Butte de Warlencourt, ending most of the major fighting in the battle.
- An earthquake estimated at 5.1 on the Richter magnitude scale struck Irondale, Alabama, causing extensive minor damage to property.
- Died:
  - Ignacio Pinazo Camarlench, 67, Spanish painter, part of the Impressionism movement with works that included Las hijas del Cid and El guardavía (b. 1849)
  - Samuel Paull Andrews, 80, New Zealand politician, member of the New Zealand Parliament for Christchurch from 1879 to 1881, the first member of the working class to hold a parliamentary position in New Zealand (b. 1836)

== October 19, 1916 (Thursday) ==
- Second Battle of Cobadin – Bulgarian, German and Ottoman troops fought a combined Russian-Romanian force around Rasova, Cobadin, Romania.
- German Navy Zeppelins participated in a High Seas Fleet sortie over the North Sea, but German and British ships failed to come in contact with one another, although Zeppelin L 14 sighted part of the Royal Navy's Harwich Force. Five Zeppelins suffered serious mechanical breakdowns during the operation.
- Bayonne refinery strike – Striking refinery workers in Bayonne, New Jersey returned to work for Standard Oil after 16 days on the picket line with no concessions given. The estimated total casualties from the violence were four dead and 34 wounded.
- British ocean liner RMS Alaunia struck a mine and sank in the English Channel, killing two people.
- The new German National Library opened in Leipzig.
- The Horseshoe Plantation in Leon County, Florida was divided up and sold to buyers, leading to the creation of Luna Plantation where amateur golfer Frances C. Griscom, daughter to deceased owner Clement Griscom, established the Water Oak Plantation.
- Born:
  - Jean Dausset, French immunologist, recipient of the Nobel Prize in Physiology or Medicine for his research into genes; as Jean-Baptiste-Gabriel-Joachim Dausset, in Toulouse, France (d. 2009)
  - Emil Gilels, Ukrainian pianist, one of the first Soviet pianists to perform in the West; as Samuil Grigoryevich Gilels, in Odessa, Russian Empire (present-day Ukraine) (d. 1985)
  - Michael Pollock, British naval officer, First Sea Lord from 1971 to 1974 and Admiral of the Fleet in 1974; in Altrincham, England (d. 2006)
  - Minoru Yasui, American lawyer, advocated American laws on Japanese internment during World War II, recipient of the Presidential Medal of Freedom; in Hood River, Oregon, United States (d. 1986)
- Died:
  - Leo Clarke, 23, Canadian soldier, recipient of the Victoria Cross at the Battle of Flers–Courcelette; killed in action (b. 1892)
  - Milton Joseph Cunningham, 74, Attorney General of Louisiana from 1884 to 1888 and 1892 to 1900 (b. 1842)

== October 20, 1916 (Friday) ==
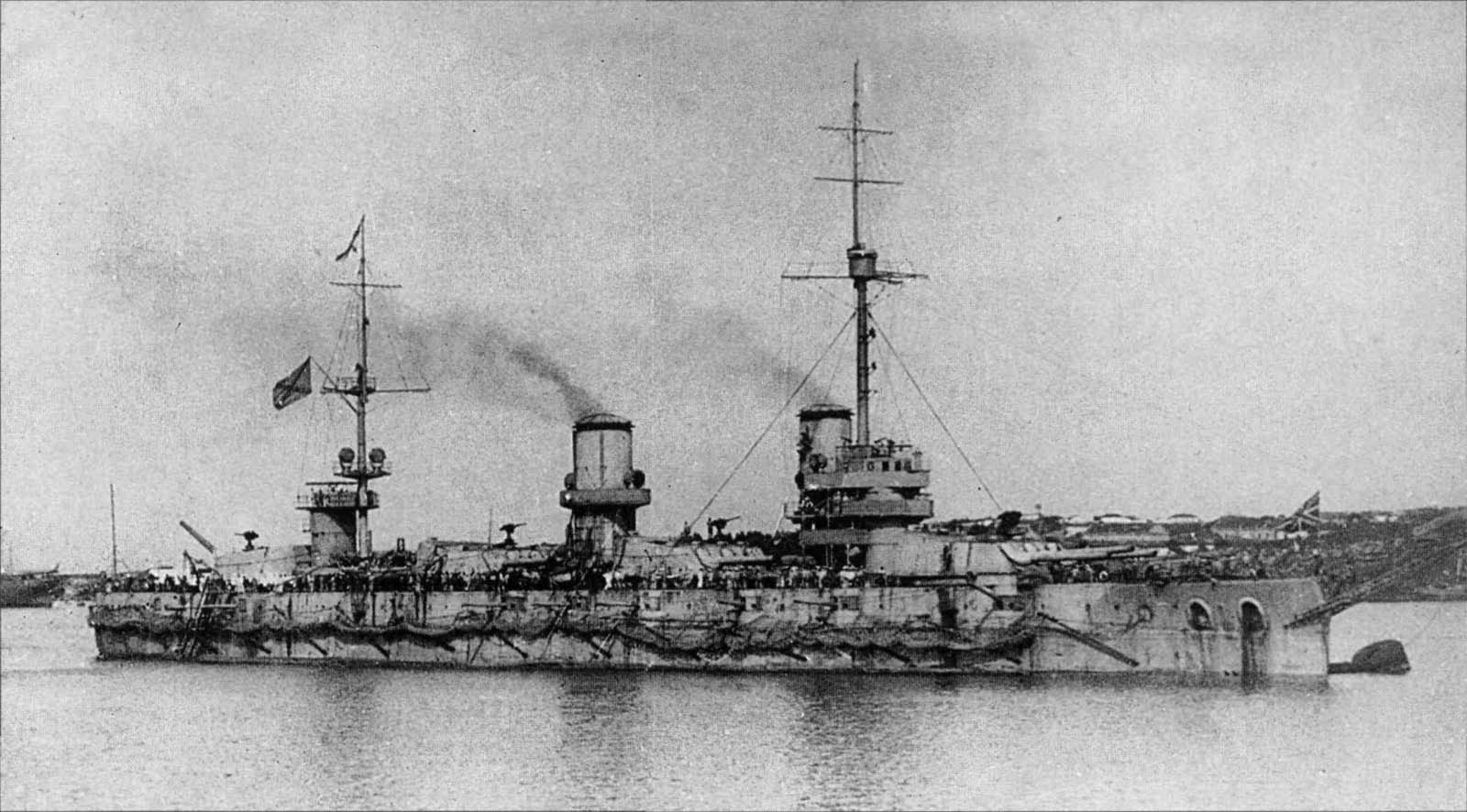
Imperatritsa Mariya at anchor in Sevastopol

- An on-board explosion sank Russian battleship Imperatritsa Mariya while anchored at Sevastopol, killing 228 crew.
- A "perfect storm" hit Lake Erie, sinking four large ships (including the James B. Colgate) and killing 49 people, in what was later referred to as "Black Friday".
- Battle of Verdun – France launched a massive counteroffensive to recapture Fort Douaumont from the Germans using two massive railway guns.
- Battle of the Ancre Heights – British forces repulsed a further German attack on Schwaben Redoubt in France using aerial reconnaissance to spot targets.
- William Melville Martin became the second Premier of Saskatchewan, replacing Walter Scott.
- The organ version of Comes Autumn Time by American composer Leo Sowerby was performed by Eric DeLamarter for the first time at Fourth Presbyterian Church in Chicago. Based on public reception, DeLamarter convinced Sowerby to create an orchestral version that debuted the following January.

== October 21, 1916 (Saturday) ==
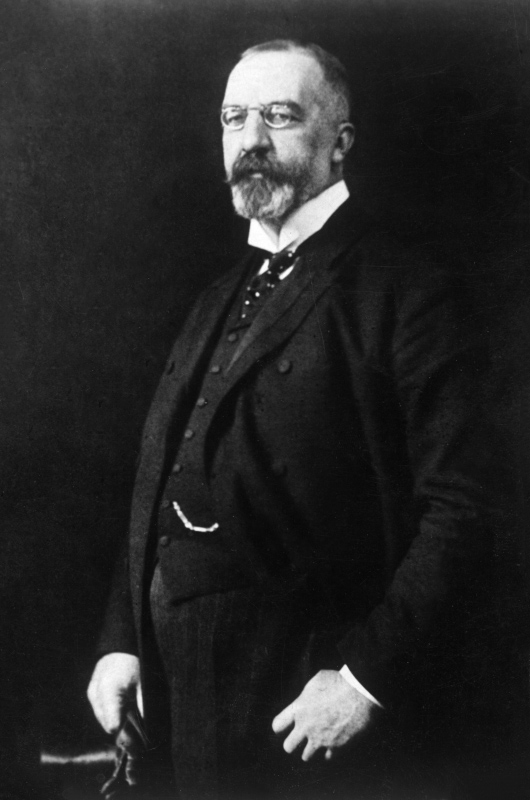
Karl von Stürgkh, Minister-President of Austria, assassinated

- Battle of the Ancre Heights – Canadian forces launched a third attack on Regina Trench and successfully captured it from the Germans.
- Friedrich Adler shot dead Count Karl von Stürgkh, Minister-President of Austria, in protest of Stürgkh's actions in 1914 to indefinitely postpone the Imperial Council, the legislative arm of the Austrian government. Emperor Franz Joseph appointed Ernest von Koerber into the position following Stürgkh's death, the last official act for the state monarch before his own death four weeks later.
- Anthony Crawford, an African-American landowner, was lynched by a mob of 200 whites while in jail in Abbeville, South Carolina. Despite repeated interventions by the local sheriff, Crawford was attacked several times by the mob over a 24-hour period after getting into an argument with a local merchant over the price of cotton. He was dragged from the jail to the local fairgrounds and hanged. Despite an investigation later pushed by South Carolina Governor Richard Manning, lack of local public cooperation forced the investigation to close with no charges laid. The United States Congress issued a formal apology to the Crawford family for the lynching in 2005.
- Born: Bill Bevens, American baseball player, pitcher of the New York Yankees during the 1947 World Series; as Floyd Clifford Bevens, in Hubbard, Oregon, United States (d. 1991)
- Died:
  - Phillip Blashki, 79, Polish-Australian public servant, justice of the peace for Melbourne City Court and for Victoria, Australia from 1911 to 1916 (b. 1837)
  - Etienne L. de Mestre, 84, Australian horse breeder and trainer, held the record for training the most winners of the Melbourne Cup (b. 1832)
  - Trifko Grabež, 21, Bosnian nationalist, member of the Black Hand involved in the assassination of Archduke Franz Ferdinand; died of tuberculosis (b. 1895)

== October 22, 1916 (Sunday) ==
- Battle of the Ancre Heights – The British further entrenched their occupation of Regina Trench by capturing 1,057 German soldiers.
- Australian screw steamer Tuncurry was wrecked during a routine delivery from Sydney to Brisbane.
- The first of the Centros Andaluces was inaugurated in Seville by Andalusian nationalist Blas Infante. The centros were cultural associations dedicated to the preservation and distribution of all aspects of Andalusian culture within Spain.
- Born:
  - Julian Rotter, American psychologist, leading proponent on social learning theory; in New York City, United States (d. 2014)
  - Roger Stanier, Canadian biologist, best known for his research into cyanobacteria,]; in Victoria, British Columbia, Canada (d. 1982)
- Died: Herbert Kilpin, 46, English association football player and manager, founder of A.C. Milan (b. 1870)

== October 23, 1916 (Monday) ==
- Battle of the Crna Bend – The Allies stepped up shelling of Bulgarian defenses on the Crna River in Macedonia.
- The German air squadron Jagdstaffel 17 was established in the Luftstreitkräfte.
- Born:
  - Kunhiraman Palat Candeth, Indian army officer, commander of the Western Army during the Indo-Pakistani War of 1971; in Ottapalam, British India (present-day India) (d. 2003)
  - William K. Jones, American marine officer, recipient of the Navy Cross and Silver Star for commands in the World War II and the Korean War; in Joplin, Missouri, United States (d. 1998)

== October 24, 1916 (Tuesday) ==
- Battle of Verdun – The French recaptured Fort Douaumont near Verdun, France.
- Born:
  - Janny Brandes-Brilleslijper, Dutch Holocaust survivor, one of the last people to see Anne Frank alive in the Auschwitz concentration camp; as Marianne Brilleslijper, in Amsterdam, Netherlands (d. 2003)
  - Anne Sharp, Scottish opera singer, best known for her collaborations with composer Benjamin Britten; in Motherwell, Scotland (d. 2011)

== October 25, 1916 (Wednesday) ==
- Second Battle of Cobadin – The Central Powers defeated Russian-Romanian forces and occupied the port of Constanța, Romania, but with a loss of 17,007 casualties.
- Battle of Transylvania – Romania lost all ground gained at the start of the offensive to conquer Transylvania but were able to halt the German advance at Prahova Valley in the Carpathian Mountains.
- Battle of Verdun – An attempt to recapture Fort Vaux failed, although French forces did take 6,000 German soldiers prisoner.
- American reproductive rights pioneer Margaret Sanger was arrested for breaking a New York state law prohibiting distribution of contraceptives following the opening of a birth control clinic in Brooklyn.
- The German air squadrons Jagdstaffel 19, 20, 21, 22, 23 and 24 were established in the Luftstreitkräfte.
- Bristol F.2 Fighter aircraft began to be used for operation by the Royal Flying Corps.
- Born:
  - Stan Cullis, English association footballer and manager, centre back for Wolverhampton from 1934 to 1947, manager for the club from 1948 to 1964; as Stanley Cullis, in Ellesmere Port, England (d. 2001)
  - Gereon Goldmann, German priest, member of the German resistance to Nazism; in Ziegenhain, German Empire (present-day Schwalmstadt, Germany) (d. 2003)
  - Jack Hawkins, American marine officer, commander of the Bay of Pigs Invasion; in Roxton, Texas, United States (d. 2013)
- Died:
  - Gérard Encausse, 51, Spanish-French occultist, founder of Martinism (b. 1865)
  - William Merritt Chase, 66, American painter, founder of the Chase School of Art which was the precursor to Parsons School of Design (b. 1849)

== October 26, 1916 (Thursday) ==
- Battle of Transylvania – German forces invaded the Oltenia region in Romania and advanced within reach of the city of Târgu Jiu before Romanian forces slowed the advance.
- Battle of the Ancre Heights – German relief forces tried to recapture Regina Trench north of Le Sars, France, from the British but it proved to be a costly failure.
- Battle of Dover Strait – German torpedo boards raided the Strait of Dover over a 48-hour period to disrupt Allied shipping. One of the ships sunk was British steamship TSS The Queen, which was captured and sunk by a German destroyer.
- The Royal Flying Corps established the No. 208 Squadron.
- Born:
  - François Mitterrand, French state leader, 21st President of France; in Jarnac, France (d. 1996)
  - Herman Bank, American engineer, member of the Jet Propulsion Laboratory and lead developer of the first American satellite Explorer 1; in Vineland, New Jersey, United States (d. 2012)
  - Payne Jennings Jr., American air force officer, best known for his involvement in the Roswell UFO incident in 1947, recipient of the Silver Star and Distinguished Flying Cross; in Chicago, United States (killed in a plane crash, 1951)

== October 27, 1916 (Friday) ==
- Romanian Campaign – Romanian forces pushed the Germans back to the border between Romania and Austria-Hungary.
- Battle of Dover Strait – British destroyers HMS Flirt and HMS Nubian were torpedoed in the Strait of Dover while battling German torpedo boats. In all, 45 British crew were killed, four wounded and 10 taken prisoner.
- Battle of Segale – Fitawrari Habte Giyorgis secured the Ethiopian throne for Empress Zewditu after defeating Negus Mikael of Wollo during his march on the Ethiopian capital in support of his son Emperor Iyasu.

== October 28, 1916 (Saturday) ==
- The first plebiscite in Australia on the issue of military conscription was held where it was defeated by a nearly four percent margin (52 percent against to 48 percent for conscription).
- British hospital ship SS Galeka struck a mine and sank, killing 19 people.
- German flying ace Oswald Boelcke was killed in a mid-air collision between his Albatros airplane and the fighter plane of fellow German ace Erwin Böhme. Author of the first formal book on the rules of conduct for aerial warfare, Boelcke had 40 confirmed victories at the time of his death.
- Australian army officer and former Olympic swimmer Frank Beaurepaire organized the "Pioneer Exhibition Game of Australian Football in London" between two teams of Australian servicemen at Queen's Club, West Kensington, London before an estimated crowd of 3,000. Funds raised from the match were donated to the Red Cross which aided many Allied servicemen.
- Born: Erich Mende, German state leader, third Vice-Chancellor of Germany; in Groß Strehlitz, German Empire (present-day Strzelce Opolskie, Poland) (d. 1998)
- Died: Cleveland Abbe, 77, American meteorologist, considered the father of the National Weather Service in the United States (b. 1838)

== October 29, 1916 (Sunday) ==
- British soldier Gunner William Lewis of the Royal Field Artillery and New Zealander John Braithwaite of the New Zealand Expeditionary Force, both convicted of mutiny at Blargies prison camp in France, suffered execution by firing squad at Rouen prison.
- Irish politician John Redmond demanded the abolition of martial law implemented during the Easter Rising, the release of suspected persons, and that Irish prisoners be treated as political prisoners.
- Born: Hadda Brooks, American musician, best known for her piano ballads for films Out of the Blue, In a Lonely Place and The Bad and the Beautiful; as Hattie L. Hapgood, in Los Angeles, United States (d. 2002)
- Died: John Sebastian Little, 65, American politician, 21st Governor of Arkansas (b. 1851)

== October 30, 1916 (Monday) ==
- Feng Guozhang won over Lu Rongting in the vice-presidential election for the Republic of China, filling the seat vacated by incumbent Li Yuanhong when he replaced Yuan Shikai as president after Yuan's sudden death in June.
- The British Reserve Army was renamed Fifth Army with General Hubert Gough retaining command.
- The Empire State Railway was established to take over and manage part of the rail properties originally held by Empire United Railways (both rail companies would consolidate in 1917). The company managed the rail line between Syracuse, New York and Oswego, New York.
- The St. Demetrios Greek Orthodox Church was incorporated in Seattle and remains the city's oldest Greek Orthodox Church congregation.
- Born:
  - Leon Day, American baseball player, pitcher for the Baltimore Black Sox, Newark Eagles, and Baltimore Elite Giants; in Alexandria, Virginia, United States (d. 1995)
  - Ken Keltner, American baseball player, third baseman for the Cleveland Indians and Boston Red Sox from 1937 to 1950; as Kenneth Frederick Keltner, in Milwaukee, United States (d. 1991)
  - Peter Paul Fuchs, Austrian-born American conductor and composer, conductor of the Metropolitan Opera from 1945 to 1950; in Vienna, Austria-Hungary (present-day Austria) (d. 2007)
- Died: Peter Dodds McCormick, 83, Scottish-Australian educator and composer, composed the Australian national anthem "Advance Australia Fair" (b. 1834)

== October 31, 1916 (Tuesday) ==
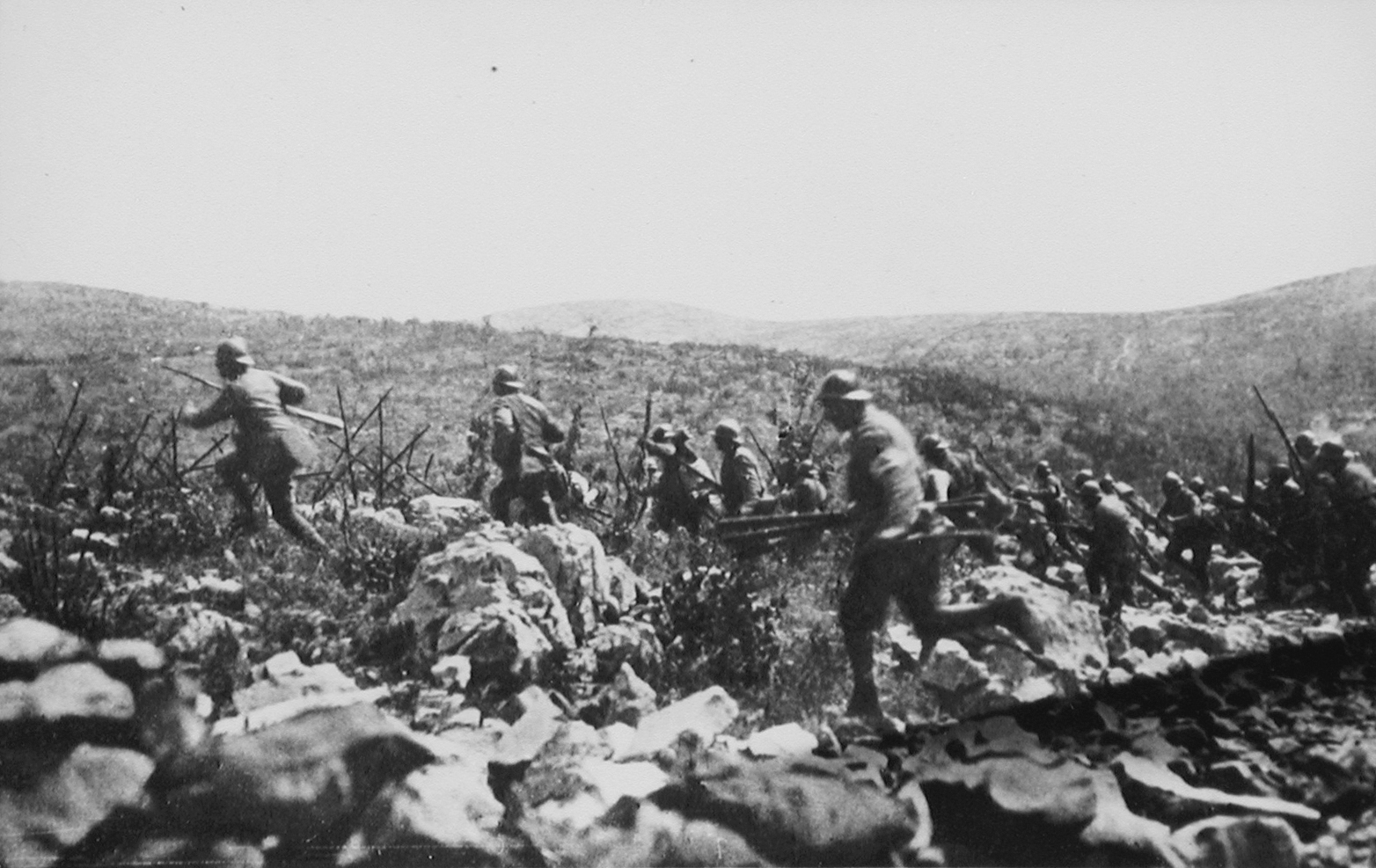
Italian infantry after leaving the trenches on the eve of the Ninth Battle of the Isonzo

- Ninth Battle of the Isonzo – Italian forces attacked the border town of Vrtojba between Italy and Austria-Hungary (now Slovenia).
- Born: Carl Johan Bernadotte, Swedish noble, Prince of Sweden, youngest child of King Gustaf VI Adolf and Princess Margaret of Connaught; in Stockholm, Sweden (d. 2012)
- Died:
  - Charles Taze Russell, 64, Protestant evangelist, founder of the Bible Student movement and forerunner of the Jehovah's Witnesses (b. 1852)
  - Huang Xing, 42, Chinese politician, first army commander-in-chief of the Republic of China; died of cirrhosis (b. 1874)
  - Nicholas Young, 76, American sports executive, president of the National Baseball League from 1885 to 1902 (b. 1840)
