= Capture of Eaucourt l'Abbaye =

- Part of the Battle of the Somme, First World War
- Battle of the Somme 1 July – 18 November 1916
Date	1–3 October 1916
Location	Picardy, France 50°05′00″N 02°47′27″E
Result	British victory

Belligerents
British Empire	Germany: Prussia

Commanders and leaders
Douglas Haig	Crown Prince Rupprecht

Strength
1 brigade	1 regiment
- Warlencourt-Eaucourt is a commune in the Pas-de-Calais department of the Nord-Pas-de-Calais region of France

The Capture of Eaucourt l'Abbaye (1–3 October 1916) was a tactical incident during the Battle of the Somme. Eaucourt is about 16 mi (26 km) south of Arras, at the junction of the D 929 and the D 10E roads. Eaucourt l'Abbaye (Eaucourt) is north-west of Martinpuich, south-east of Le Sars, south of the Butte de Warlencourt west of Gueudecourt and north-west of Flers. Eaucourt was a group of farm buildings in an enclosure built on the site of an Augustinian abbey, on a side road from Le Sars off the main Albert–Bapaume highway. Destremont Farm, to the south-west of Le Sars and a derelict quarry, south of Eaucourt, had been fortified by the Germans.

Military operations began in the area in September 1914 during the Race to the Sea, when the divisions of the II Bavarian Corps advanced westwards on the north bank of the Somme, towards Albert and Amiens. Eaucourt l'Abbaye became a backwater until 1916, when the British and French began the Battle of the Somme (1 July – 13 November). During the Battle of Flers–Courcelette (15–22 September), divisions of the British III Corps, in the Fourth Army, advanced close to Eaucourt and operations to capture it began on 1 October. A regiment of the 6th Bavarian Reserve Division in Eaucourt was overrun by a brigade of the 47th (1/2nd London) Division on 1 October, during the Battle of Le Transloy (1 October – 5 November).

Operations continued until 3 October. After Eaucourt was captured, British attacks continued in the area, to take the Butte de Warlencourt, which was captured several times and lost to German counter-attacks, during the rest of the Battle of Le Transloy. In the winter of 1916–1917, which was the worst for fifty years, the area was considered by the troops of the I Anzac Corps to be the foulest sector of the Somme front. Eaucourt was lost on 24 March 1918 during the retreat of the 2nd Division and recaptured for the last time on 26 August, by the 21st Division.

== Background ==
=== 1914 ===
On 25 September, during the Race to the Sea a French attack north of the Somme against the II Bavarian Corps (General Karl Ritter von Martini), forced a hurried withdrawal. As more Bavarian units arrived in the north, the 3rd Bavarian Division advanced along the north bank of the Somme, through Bouchavesnes, Leforest and Hardecourt until held up at Maricourt. The 4th Bavarian Division further to the north, defeated French Territorial divisions and then attacked westwards in the vicinity of Gueudecourt, towards Albert, through Sailly, Combles, Guillemont and Montauban, leaving a flank guard on the northern flank facing Eaucourt. The II Bavarian Corps and XIV Reserve Corps (Generalleutnant Hermann von Stein) pushed back a French Territorial division from the area around Bapaume and advanced towards Bray-sur-Somme and Albert, as part of an offensive down the Somme valley to reach the sea. The German offensive was confronted north of the Somme by the northern corps of the French Second Army east of Albert. The XIV Reserve Corps attacked on 28 September, along the Roman road from Bapaume to Albert and Amiens, intending to reach the Ancre and then continue westwards along the Somme valley. The 28th (Baden) Reserve Division advanced close to Fricourt against scattered resistance from French infantry and cavalry.

=== 1916 ===
Late on 20 July, when Eaucourt was 3,300 ft (1,000 m) behind the front line, I Battalion, Infantry Regiment 62 of the 5th Division was billeted in the grounds and advanced from the area to counter-attack Bois Foureaux (High Wood) the next morning. Next day, a Royal Flying Corps (RFC) reconnaissance aircraft of 3 Squadron saw a new German defence line from Le Transloy to Warlencourt, just in front of Eaucourt and that an extra line had been dug along the third line, from Eaucourt to Flers. (Note: Eaucourt l'Abbaye was an enclosure, with two farm buildings inside, on the site of an Augustinian abbey, which had several cellars in good condition.) On 15 September, the positions of the II Bavarian Corps around Martinpuich, Le Sars and Eaucourt were severely bombarded and artillery units in the area encountered British tanks for the first time, as British infantry advanced from Flers, supported by about thirty aircraft. By late September, the front line crossed the Albert–Bapaume road from the south-west to the north-east, through positions captured by III Corps during the Battle of Morval, when it provided a northern flank guard by attacking the maze of trenches west of Le Sars and Eaucourt. The 6th Bavarian Reserve Division opposite, occupied Flers Trench (Below Riegel), the farmstead of Eaucourt with Bavarian Infantry Regiment 21 and Gird Trench (Gallwitz Riegel), which ran behind the Butte de Warlencourt. The division was under constant British artillery-fire, which caused many casualties. Crown Prince Rupprecht, the commander of Heeresgruppe Kronprinz Rupprecht von Bayern (Army Group Rupprecht of Bavaria), advocated a retirement from the salient south and east of Eaucourt, between Below Riegel and Goose Alley, because it was untenable; General Fritz von Below the 1st Army commander, refused the suggestion because cross-fire could be aimed from the area onto the positions either side.

== Prelude ==
=== British offensive preparations ===
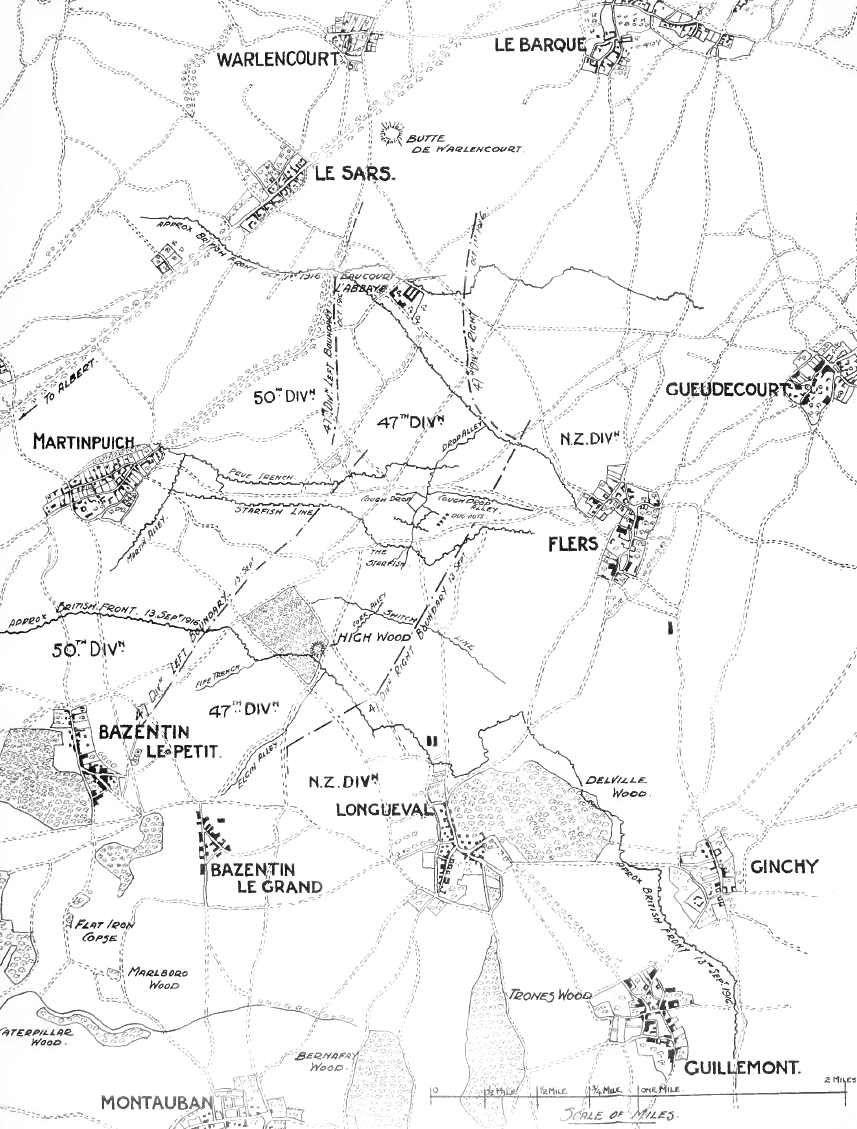
47th (1/2nd London) Division attack on Eaucourt l'Abbaye, October 1916

By 21 September, the 47th (1/2nd London) Division had been relieved after the capture of High Wood and the remainder of the month was spent resting, refitting and absorbing fresh drafts; the net loss to the division after the High Wood operations was reduced to 111 officers and 1,471 other ranks. The new men had little time for training with their units and the lack of experienced officers placed greater responsibility on those that remained. On 28 September, Major-General Sir Charles Barter was sacked and replaced by Major-General Sir George Gorringe. (Note: Barter had been most critical of the III Corps plan for the attack on High Wood on 15 September and had tried to get the use of tanks cancelled. Pulteney had insisted on their use, despite the reservations of his tank advisors and sacked Barter for "... wanton waste of men...." In four days the division had suffered 4,500 casualties.) The 141st Brigade returned to the line to take over the line from the 1st Division by dawn on 29 September. A further advance was intended, in which the 47th (1/2nd London) Division objective was Eaucourt l'Abbaye, a farmstead on the site of an Augustinian abbey. The area was reputed to have extensive cellars at a low point, where a short valley running from High Wood turns at a right angle, north-westwards to the Albert–Bapaume road. Eaucourt is commanded by higher ground on every side except to the north-west. Before the attack it was desirable to push forward along the Flers Line, to the high ground south-east of the village and the 18th Battalion attacked the feature on 29 September; the attack failed but on 30 September, a second attack gained the objective.

=== British plan of attack ===
After the success of the Battle of Morval (25–28 September) and the Battle of Thiepval Ridge (26–28 September) the Fourth Army was instructed on 29 September, to plan the capture of the area around Le Transloy, Beaulencourt and a ridge beyond the valley containing Thilloy and Warlencourt. The attack was to be ready by 12 October and be made in conjunction with attacks by the Reserve Army and the Third Army further north. Before the big offensive, the Fourth Army was to continue its attack to the north-east, to capture a spur short of Le Transloy and Beaulencourt and to the north to reach the near side of the Thilloy–Warlencourt valley. The Fourth Army had already ordered an advance on the left flank on 1 October, to capture Eaucourt and the Flers Line (Below Riegel) up to Le Sars. The New Zealand Division of XV Corps further east, was to swing forward on its left flank by attacking the Gird Trenches (Gallwitz Riegel) 1,500 yd (1,400 m) east of Eaucourt. In the 47th (1/2nd London) Division area, the 141st Brigade was to attack with three battalions and two tanks, which were to assemble at the Starfish and drive 1,500 yd (1,400 m) to the right flank of the brigade, attacking up the Flers trenches to Eaucourt.

=== German defensive preparations ===
In early September, Rupprecht found that frequent relief of troops opposite the British was essential and the other armies on the Western Front were stripped of fresh divisions and units. After the sacking of Erich von Falkenhayn, the German Chief of the General Staff on 29 August, his successors General Paul von Hindenburg and General Erich Ludendorff visited the Western Front and ordered an end to offensive operations at the Battle of Verdun and the reinforcement of the Somme front. Tactics were reviewed and a more "elastic" defence was advocated, to replace the defence of tactically unimportant ground and the routine counter-attacking of Allied advances. After the Battle of Morval, all of the divisions from Combles to Thiepval had to be relieved again and the defences around Eaucourt were taken over by the 6th Bavarian Reserve Division. Destremont Farm, to the south-west of Le Sars, on the north side of the Albert–Bapaume road and a derelict quarry south of Eaucourt had been fortified by the Germans; to the east a sunken lane running north from High Wood crossed the German third line. The junction had been fortified and joined Drop Trench and Goose Alley, forming a quadrilateral. To the north-east, more defensive works were known as Factory Corner. In late September, a brigade of the 6th Bavarian Reserve Division occupied the defences around Eaucourt.

== Battle ==
=== 1 October ===
The attack on Eaucourt I'Abbaye started at 3.15 p.m. on 1 October. A 34 Squadron RFC observer over Eaucourt who watched the attack, reported that

... they do not seem to be the target of much enemy shellfire. The enemy barrage... bore no relation to the wall of fire we were putting up...

— Major John Chamier

and that the German artillery reply was much smaller and was scattered 300–400 yd (270–370 m) around the jumping-off points. Chamier wrote that the British barrage was of an extraordinary volume, moved in a straight line and made the attack easy where the infantry were able to keep up with it. The 1/19th London Regiment managed to advance within 50 yd (46 m) of the German front line and was then driven under cover in shell-holes by German machine-gun fire. The infantry waited for the two tanks, which had to drive some distance and did not reach the 1/19th London until an hour after zero. The tanks drove along either side of the Flers trenches from right to left, firing at the German infantry and silenced machine-guns firing from the west side of the Abbey enclosure, enabling the infantry to resume their advance. The rear waves of the battalion dug in along Flers Support and the forward waves, despite many casualties, pressed on through Eaucourt and met New Zealand troops on the Le Barque road.

The 1/20th London had Eaucourt as its objective and crossed the Flers trenches after the tanks had driven by, then rushed through the farmstead and established a line to the north with the 1/19th London. The position was held under difficult conditions until a line was consolidated round Eaucourt. Both tanks ditched in the Flers trenches west the farm and on the left flank, the 1/17th London encountered uncut wire in front of the Flers Line; some troops got through the wire despite several unsuppressed machine-guns but not in strong enough force to hold the line. Troops of II Battalion, Bavarian Infantry Regiment 17, counter-attacked south-eastwards along the Flers trenches and bombed the British out, as the tanks were set on fire and the crews withdrawn. The new position was vulnerable because of the open left flank, which left a gap to the right of the 50th (Northumberland) Division in the Flers trenches.

=== 2–3 October ===
The 1/23rd London, which had been attached from the 142nd Brigade, was ordered to attack the Flers Line and to push on through Eaucourt, to link with the 1/19th and 1/20th London, when news of the repulse of the 1/17th London reached the 47th divisional headquarters, in the early hours of 2 October. The 1/23rd London attack was planned for 5:00 a.m. on 2 October, just before dawn but owing to the dark and wet night, the battalion was not assembled until 6:25 a.m. and attacked at 6:45 a.m. in daylight. The battalion was under-strength, tired and was withdrawn after the advancing waves were cut down by machine-gun fire from the flank and lost 170 casualties. Rain began around 11:00 a.m. and lasted for two more days. At noon on, two companies of the 1/18th London, which had taken over from the 1/17 London, reported that the Flers trenches were almost empty of Germans and at 3:35 p.m. attacked up the Flers Line against little opposition, reached the area to the north-west of Eaucourt and made contact with the 1/20th London, which completed the circuit troops round the village. Touch was also established with the 68th Brigade of the 23rd Division, which had taken over from the 50th Division. During the night of 2/3 October, Bavarian Reserve Infantry Regiment 21 was replaced by Regiment 16 but were not able to hold Eaucourt.

== Aftermath ==
=== Analysis ===
It was discovered by the British that on the night of 1 October, the battalion of Bavarian Reserve Infantry Regiment 21, which had faced the 141st Brigade, had been due for relief that night and left before the replacements arrived. The Germans had quickly rushed up a battalion from support; two companies occupied the Flers Line opposite Eaucourt and one company moved east of Eaucourt but small-arms fire from the foremost troops of the 141st Brigade and British artillery-fire forced the Germans under cover. Another company came west of the village through the gap and re-occupied trenches, just in time to meet the attack of the 1/23rd London the next morning. The dark night, pouring rain and the lack of time for reconnaissance of the captured ground had made the positions captured by the British difficult to defend. The success of III Corps in capturing Eaucourt (and Le Sars a few days later) was the last big victory of the Fourth Army in 1916; subsequent attacks on the Butte de Warlencourt were costly failures. The German infantry opposite the Fourth Army had to defend improvised positions, which were destroyed by British heavy artillery-fire, causing many casualties. (The defeats inflicted by the French led to the sacking of the 2nd Army Chief of Staff, Colonel Fritz Bronsart von Schellendorf). The 5th Army at Verdun was ordered to retire from every piece of ground not necessary for the defence of the front, to create reserves for the Somme. The six divisions holding the line from Le Transloy to the Ancre were replaced by seven fresh divisions from the end of September to 13 October, two of which were relieved in turn.

=== Casualties ===
Bavarian Reserve Infantry Regiment 16 lost 1,177 casualties from 3 to 13 October and had only 350 infantrymen fit to fight.

=== Subsequent operations ===
On 4 October, the 47th (1/2nd London) Division brigades completed the capture of Flers Support unopposed and after nightfall on 5 October, advanced to occupy a ruined mill north-west of Eaucourt. The capture of Eaucourt enabled the British to move several artillery batteries over the High Wood ridge into a valley beyond the Starfish, where they supported attacks on the Butte de Warlencourt. Bavarian Infantry Regiment 16 remained in the line near Eaucourt and suffered many casualties from British artillery-fire and infantry attacks. By 5 October, the commander of I Battalion reported that the battlefield conditions were extraordinary; morale was low because of cold rations and constant artillery-fire, some from German artillery; the number of casualties and the inability to bury dead, which were strewn around the trenches, sapped morale further. The cold, rainy weather poor food and lack of hygiene caused a big increase in non-battle casualties, with up to 1 1/3 of the troops contracting diarrhoea.

There were no troops to spare to rest the garrison, despite constant appeals from the commanders. Several local counter-attacks were made and on 8 October, a big British attack was repulsed. In the afternoon of 12 October, the next British attack found the Bavarian companies reduced to about 35 men each, with rifles and 18 machine-guns to defend an area of 3,300 ft × 4,900 ft (1,000 m × 1,500 m). The defenders managed to repulse the attack and recapture a British foothold in the area of the 7th Company and were then relieved by Reserve Infantry Regiment 181. Bavarian Reserve Infantry Regiment 16 had suffered 1,177 casualties in ten days and had only 350 infantrymen fit to fight. During the winter lull of 1916–1917, sniping, trench raiding and artillery exchanges continued until the German retreat to the Hindenburg Line in March 1917.

=== 1918 ===
Eaucourt was lost on 24 March 1918, during the retreat of the 2nd Division in Operation Michael, the German spring offensive. The area was recaptured for the last time on 26 August, by the 21st Division, during the Second Battle of Bapaume.
