= Military reserve =

Available units held back from battle

A military reserve, active reserve, reserve formation, or simply reserve, is a group of military personnel or units that is initially not committed to a battle by its commander, so that it remains available to address unforeseen situations or exploit sudden opportunities. Reserves may be held back to defend against attack from other enemy forces, to be committed to the existing battle if the enemy exposes a vulnerability, or to serve as relief for troops already fighting. As reserves (especially in the defence) represent a "hedge against uncertainty", the size of the reserve depends on the level of uncertainty a commander has about the enemy's intentions. Some of the different categories of military reserves are: tactical reserve, operational reserve, and strategic reserve.

A military reserve is different from a military reserve force, which is a military organization composed of military personnel (reservists) who maintain their military skills and readiness in a long-term part-time commitment to support their country if needed. Military reserve refers to specific trained pre-organized forces operating on an on-call basis from the main military force.

== Reserves at various levels ==
Reserves are kept and employed at all levels, from a platoon held back from a company level engagement, to whole army corps consisting of armoured and mechanised divisions which are held in reserve with the purpose of exploiting a breakthrough or containing an enemy advance. Typically what is a reserve for one headquarters is not the reserve for a higher headquarters (though depending on the setup they may be). So if one of a battalion's companies is held in reserve during a battle, the company is considered to be a reserve for the battalion but not for the brigade or the division, since it is committed to action in its parent battalion sector.

== Employment ==
Deciding where, how and especially when to employ reserves is a key command decision. In the event of reserves being sent forward to exploit a breakthrough, some are typically held back to deal with a potential counterattack. Alternatively, US Army doctrine states that a commander should reform another reserve after committing his existing reserve. Reserves can also be employed to relieve troops in action, allowing those units to rest and regroup away from the front line.

== Notable reserve units ==
- British Reserve Army – A field army of the British Expeditionary Force during the First World War. The intended purpose of the army was to carry out the breakthrough phase of the Somme offensive once General Sir Henry Rawlinson's Fourth Army had captured the German front-line trenches.
- Reserve of the Supreme High Command – The principal reserve of the Soviet Red Army during World War II. Now part of the Russian Armed Forces.

== See also ==
- National guard
