= Capture of Regina Trench =

1916 incident in the Battle of the Somme

Regina Trench
- Part of the Battle of the Somme, First World War
- Battle of the Somme 1 July – 18 November 1916
Date	1 October – 11 November 1916
Location	Picardy, France 50°04′18″N 02°46′53″E
Result	British victory

Belligerents
(United Kingdom of Great Britain and Ireland); British Empire; Canada	Germany

Commanders and leaders
Douglas Haig; Henry Rawlinson	Fritz von Below; Ludwig von Schröder

Strength
4 Canadian Corps divisions	Early October: Marinebrigade; (3 marine infantry regiments)

Casualties and losses
Canadian: 14,207	Marine Infantry Regiment II: 686; Marine Infantry regiments I and III up to 41 per cent

The Capture of Regina Trench (Staufen Riegel) was a tactical incident in 1916 during the Battle of the Somme in the First World War. Regina Trench was the Canadian name for a German trench dug along the north-facing slope of a ridge running from north-west of the village of Le Sars, south-westwards to Stuff Redoubt (Staufenfeste) close to the German fortifications at Thiepval. It was the longest German trench on the Western Front. Attacked several times by the Canadian Corps during the Battle of the Ancre Heights, the 5th Canadian Brigade of the 2nd Canadian Division briefly controlled a section of the trench on 1 October but was repulsed by counter-attacks of the German Marine Brigade (equivalent to an army division) that had been brought from the Belgian coast. On 8 October, attacks by the 1st Canadian Division and the 3rd Canadian Division on Regina Trench also failed.

On 21 October, the 4th Canadian Division attacked the western portion of Regina Trench, as the 18th (Eastern) Division, 25th Division and the 39th Division of II Corps, attacked the part further west (Stuff Trench to the British). The Canadians met little opposition and gained the objective, as the II Corps divisions captured Stuff Trench in thirty minutes, giving the Reserve Army (Fifth Army from 30 October) control of Thiepval Ridge. Three counter-attacks were repulsed by the Canadians and by 22 October, more than a thousand Germans had been taken prisoner. The east end of the trench was captured by the 4th Canadian Division during the night of 10/11 November.

== Background ==
=== Battle of Thiepval Ridge ===
The Battle of Thiepval Ridge was the first large offensive mounted by the Reserve Army (Lieutenant-General Hubert Gough), during the Battle of the Somme. The offensive was intended to benefit from the Fourth Army attack at the Battle of Morval, by starting 24 hours afterwards. The battle was fought on a front from Courcelette in the east near the Albert–Bapaume road, to Thiepval and the Schwaben Redoubt (Schwaben-Feste) in the west, which overlooked German defences further north in the Ancre valley and on the rising ground towards Beaumont Hamel and Serre on the other side of the river. Thiepval Ridge was fortified and the German defenders fought with great determination, while British infantry–artillery co-ordination declined after the first day, due to the confused nature of the fighting in the maze of trenches, dug-outs and shell-craters.

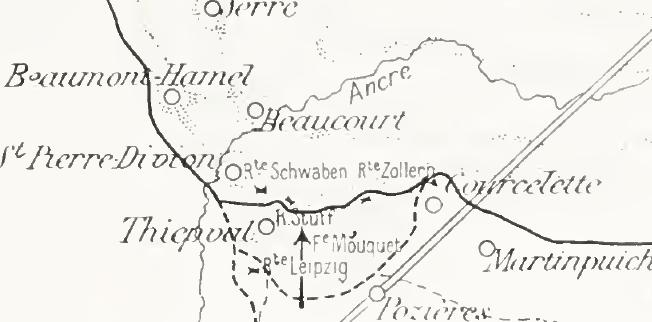
Capture of Thiepval plateau, Somme, 26 September 1916

On 26 September, Thiepval was outflanked on the right, with the loss of the village and most of the garrison. The British infantry managed an advance of 1,000–2,000 yd (910–1,830 m) on the 6,000 yd (3.4 mi; 5.5 km) attack front. The British pushed on towards Stuff and Schwaben redoubts until the end of the month and Reserve Army attacks resumed in the Battle of the Ancre Heights, which began on 1 October. The British had made better use of their artillery and although German artillery ammunition consumption in September rose to 4.1 million shells from the 1.5 million fired in August, much of the ammunition was wasted on unobserved area bombardments, while defensive barrage fire was limited to three-minute periods; up to 25 per cent of the German guns became unserviceable in battle, due to mechanical failure.

== Prelude ==
=== British preparations ===
An offensive by the Reserve Army was planned for mid-October and Gough reorganised the Reserve Army divisions on the north side of the Ancre. On the south side of the river, Regina Trench (Staufen Riegel) along the reverse slope of Thiepval Ridge, north of Courcelette and Thiepval and the remainder of Stuff and Schwaben redoubts were to be captured by the Canadian Corps and II Corps on 1 October, ready for a northward advance, during the offensive which was due around 12 October, jumping-off from the front held by the Canadian Corps.

=== German preparations ===
In late September, the Marine Infantry Brigade, comprising the 1st and 2nd Marine-Brigaden from the 1st Marine-Division and the 3rd Marine-Brigade from the 2nd Marine-Division, with an infantry complement equivalent to an army division. The marines were well-trained and rested troops of excellent quality and were transferred from the Belgian coast to the Somme. The move was part of a general relief of the divisions opposite the British. On 30 September, the Marine-Brigaden moved up through Baum Mulde (Boom Ravine) and relieved the 8th Division on the right of the 4th Ersatz Division. Staufen Riegel (Stuff/Regina Trench) was found to have disappeared, due to the effect of the British artillery bombardments. Staufen Riegel had been dug as a supply route to Staufenfeste (Stuff Redoubt) and was on the reverse slope, which proved a considerable advantage against an attack from the south. Reserves could be sheltered nearby at Baum Mulde (Boom Ravine), which was difficult for British artillery to bombard from the south, because of the obstruction of the ridge. In the long periods of poor visibility, artillery observation aircraft were grounded, which made British bombardments even more inaccurate but the Marine-Brigade still had a stream of casualties caused by shellfire. Nightly supply and frequent relief enabled the Marines to hold their positions.

== Battle ==
=== 1 October ===
At 7:50 a.m. the 2nd Canadian Division reported to the corps headquarters and corps artillery, that study of aerial photographs showed Regina and Kenora trenches had been insufficiently bombarded. The divisional commander was assured that the bombardment would be completed during the morning. At 12:30 a.m. Brigadier-General Elmsley, the 8th Canadian Brigade commander, reported that the wire in front of Regina Trench was uncut, which led to the artillery continuing the wire-cutting bombardment up to the last minute. At 3:15 p.m. the Canadian Corps attacked Regina Trench on the higher ground west of Courcelette Trench to consolidate up to Dyke Road and establish a defensive flank on a track to Destremont Farm. The British artillery bombardment increased in intensity to "drumfire", while the German artillery remained silent because of a shortage of ammunition, being limited to firing only when the infantry attack began.

British aircraft flew overhead at 100 ft (30 m) observing for the artillery, strafing the ground whenever they saw movement and throwing hand-grenades to the ground. The British artillery lifted towards Baum Mulde and Miraumont and the 8th Division troops saw waves of Canadian infantry advancing, while they were being relieved by the Marine Brigade. The Germans fired rockets to alert the German artillery, which opened fire immediately. Two 2nd Canadian Division battalions advanced east of the East Miraumont road against spasmodic machine-gun fire and dug in, having moved forward 400 yd (370 m) and eliminated bulges at the flanks of the brigade area. An attack by the 23rd Division of III Corps on the right flank, had also succeeded and gained touch with the Canadians.

The 5th Canadian Brigade attacked 1,000 yd (910 m) of the trench west of the East Miraumont road but a German barrage caught the support waves of the right-hand battalion and machine-gun fire swept the leading wave. A few survivors managed to get through the wire and were overwhelmed. The central battalion reached Kenora Trench and dug in under small-arms fire, partly from a flank and the left-hand battalion reached its objective in Regina Trench. The 3rd Canadian Division battalion to the left was driven back by a German counter-attack and a large party of Germans began to bomb along the trench. By nightfall the 5th Canadian Brigade held most of Kenora Trench and outposts in the West Miraumont road and Courcelette Trench. The 3rd Canadian Division attacked with two battalions of the 8th Canadian Brigade on the right but a German barrage fell on the front line a few minutes before zero hour. Both battalions managed to cross no man's land, despite machine-gun fire, force their way into Regina Trench through uncut wire and commence a bombing fight with I Battalion, Marine Regiment 2 and I Battalion, Marine Regiment 1, which had relieved the 8th Division at the end of September.

A counter-attack by I Bataillon and II Bataillon of Marine Regiment 2, overcame the Canadians in mutually costly fighting at 2:00 a.m. on 2 October, when the last Canadian foothold west of the Courcelette–Grandcourt road was abandoned. Preparations began for another attack but bad weather forced a delay. A bombardment was maintained on Regina Trench, despite high winds and poor visibility and the 3rd Canadian Division was relieved by the 2nd Canadian Division by 4 October, which then moved the left flank eastwards, as the 25th Division of II Corps extended its flank. On 6 October, the 1st Canadian Division took over on the right flank of the Canadian Corps, which lay east of the Pys road. The Canadians connected their advanced posts along a line about 300 yd (270 m) short of Regina Trench and sent scouting parties forward each day, who reported that the wire in front of the trench was being cut but that the Germans were putting out "concertina" wire to fill the gaps.

=== 8 October ===
The 1st Canadian Division attacked on 8 October at 4:50 a.m. in cold rain. The 1st Brigade on the right with two battalions, took the front trench of the Le Sars line from Dyke Road to 400 yd (370 m) beyond the Quadrilateral, then repulsed a counter-attack with artillery-fire. As the Canadians reorganised before resuming the attack on the Quadrilateral, a heavy German bombardment fell in the area and a counter-attack began from two directions. After hours of costly fighting, the Canadians withdrew to their jumping-off trenches when they ran out of bombs. The Canadians had suffered 770 casualties out of 1,100 men and taken 240 prisoners. After dark, a trench was dug on the right to link with the 23rd Division. The right-hand battalion of the 3rd Canadian Brigade was delayed by uncut wire but forced its way through and took part of Regina Trench on its right flank. The left-hand battalion was stopped in front of the trench with many casualties and the brigade withdrew at nightfall. A few troops of the right-flank battalion of the 9th Canadian Brigade, 3rd Canadian Division got into Regina Trench through some German sally ports but was overwhelmed. The battalion on the left flank, reached Regina Trench at the junction with Courcelette Trench but was then forced back. Part of the 7th Canadian Brigade reached Regina Trench, began to bomb westwards and also worked up the West Miraumont road but was eventually forced back by German counter-attacks. The left hand battalion was obstructed by new German barbed wire covered by machine-guns and was not able to advance up Kenora Trench. Relief of the Canadian Corps began on 10 October.

=== 21 October ===
The British attack was postponed from 19 October; the attack began with the 4th Canadian Division on the right and the 18th, 25th and 39th divisions in line to the left, on a 5,000 yd (2.8 mi; 4.6 km) front. The fire, from 200 heavy guns and howitzers and the field artilleries of seven divisions, was found to have severely damaged Regina Trench and cut most of the wire. The 4th Canadian Division attacked the trench at 12:06 p.m. with the 11th Canadian Brigade, supported by an overhead machine-gun barrage; the Canadians swiftly captured the trench. East of the Courcelette–Pys road, a defensive flank was formed, with outposts pushed forward from Regina Trench; the left-hand battalion linked with troops from the 18th (Eastern) Division. Three German counter-attacks were defeated during the afternoon. The 5th Ersatz Division, which had relieved the Marine Brigade on 11/12 October, was pushed back for 500 yd (460 m). By 22 October, the British had captured 1,057 prisoners from the 28th Reserve and 5th Ersatz divisions, which were relieved in turn by the 38th Division and the 58th Division, which counter-attacked Staufenfeste and Regina Trench further east on 26 October. The attack was a costly failure, with many casualties in Infantry Regiment 107 of the 58th Division and Guard Reserve Regiment 2 of the 1st Guard Reserve Division. Divisions which had already fought on the Somme, were being sent back but their fighting power had been much eroded.

=== 10/11 November ===
After two months of attacks and constant shelling, the remaining part of Regina Trench to the east of the Courcelette–Pys road was taken by a night attack on 10/11 November, by the 4th Canadian Division. The trench was attacked by the 46th (S. Saskatchewan) and 47th (British Columbia) battalions of the 10th Canadian Brigade, with a company of the 102nd Battalion of the 11th Canadian Brigade on the right flank. The Canadians crept close to the German line before the barrage began; after eight minutes the barrage suddenly lifted, the Canadians rushed the trench and surprised the German garrison. Advanced posts were pushed forward in the centre and in trenches leading north-eastwards, towards the line between Le Sars and Pys. The Canadians took 87 prisoners mainly from Infantry Regiment 107 of the 58th Division, with some troops from Guard Reserve Regiment 2 of the 1st Guard Reserve Division and four machine-guns, for a loss of c. 200 casualties; several German counter-attacks were defeated.

== Aftermath ==
=== Analysis ===
On 5 October, Gough had issued a Memorandum on Attacks which summarised the lessons of the battle. Gough pointed out that maintaining the momentum of an attack required that succeeding waves and reserves not wait for opportunities to intervene in the battle, because communication delays left them with no time to act. Brigadiers should reorganise the troops holding successive objectives, since these troops became reserves once the advance had moved on and should move with the advance. Divisional commanders should create reserves by reorganising their brigades. Headquarters should be placed where attacks could be seen, to keep in touch with events when communications broke down, a chronic problem which was increased by distance from the front line. Telephone links in the rear were far easier to maintain but became less important once the infantry battle began. Corps headquarters also had the benefit of air observation and less need of direct communication with troops on the battlefield, since their main role was counter-battery artillery-fire, which was independent of the infantry battle. The attack was to be maintained by the use of reserves moving towards objectives laid down before the attack, to make them independent of messages from the front line, which were often delayed and out of date if they arrived.

Reports made after the battle by units of the Canadian Corps stressed that battalion command was impossible once an attack began, companies and platoons needed to be given objectives before the attack and discretion on how to reach them. The attacking troops should have 24 hours in the line to study the ground, followed by 24 hours in reserve to receive a detailed briefing. The Canadians suggested that the first wave should not carry tools but a light load of 120 rounds of ammunition, two hand grenades, two days' rations and a ground sheet. Some units pointed out that most of the tools carried by the leading troops were thrown away anyway. The importance of carrying enough hand grenades was stressed, since uncut wire forced the attackers into German communication trenches, where many more were used to fight forward compared to an advance on the surface, which used up the stock intended to repel counter-attacks.

Where the wire was cut, the infantry could move above ground, bypassing isolated German defences and leaving them for mopping-up parties. The value of Lewis guns and enough ammunition was emphasised in many reports, as was the importance of moving them forward quickly, to support the infantry and engage German counter-attacks. By the end of the Battle of the Somme, each platoon had a Lewis gun, giving 16 per battalion. Opinion was divided over the Stokes mortar because of its rate of fire; each bomb weighed about 11 lb (5.0 kg), which meant that it was impractical to carry many forward in an attack. The mortar was most useful in static positions at the rear until supply routes had been built to the new front line. Tanks were judged to be limited in mechanical reliability, mobility and armour protection but useful accessories to infantry operations, having overcome German strong points and diverted German artillery-fire from the infantry. It was found that tank-infantry co-ordination had been impossible, since tanks and infantry moved at different speeds; when infantry led an attack, tanks could mop-up behind them and when tanks led, they could destroy German defences before the infantry arrived.

=== Casualties ===
The 2nd Canadian Division suffered casualties from 1 September to 4 October of 6,530 men; from 27 September to 14 October, the 3rd Canadian Division had casualties of 2,969 men and the 18th (Eastern) Division suffered 3,344 casualties from 26 September to 5 October. Canadian Corps casualties suffered on 8 October were 1,364 men. When the Canadian Corps was relieved, it had suffered 24,029 casualties during the Battle of the Somme, roughly 24 per cent of the force. The Marine Infantry Brigade suffered 106 killed, 533 wounded and 47 missing in Marine Infantry Regiment 2; Regiments 1 and 3 suffered casualties of up to 41 per cent.

== Commemoration ==
=== Regina Trench Cemetery ===
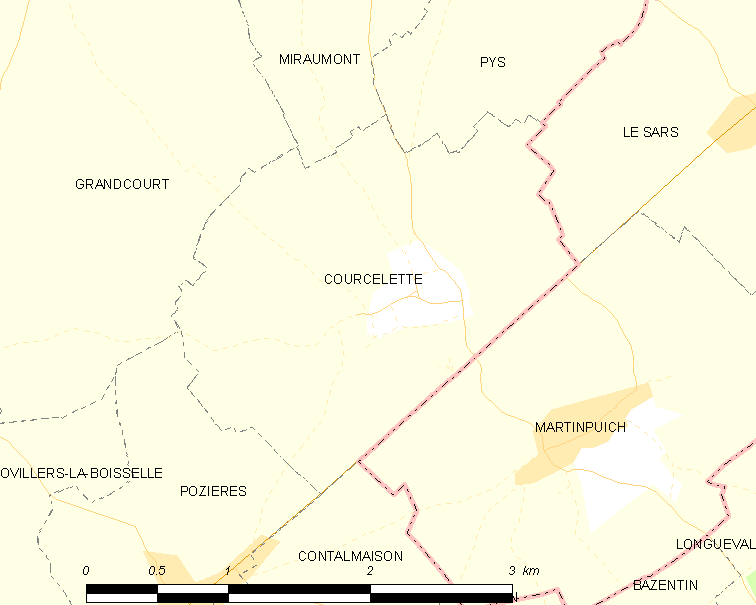
Vicinity of Regina Trench (Map commune FR insee code 80216)

Regina Trench Cemetery is a Commonwealth War Graves Commission cemetery, situated astride the location of the trench, containing 2,279 burials and commemorations of men killed at or near the trench line during the First World War. 1,680 of the men are identified as British, 564 Canadian, 35 Australian, one American airman and there are 1,077 burials of unknown soldiers, with special memorials to 14 casualties believed to be buried among them. Most of the men buried at Regina Trench fell in battle between October 1916 and February 1917. The original portion of the cemetery (Plot II, Rows A to D) was established during the winter of 1916–1917.

After the armistice in 1918, the Regina Trench location was selected as a "concentration cemetery" with mortal remains brought in from scattered graves and small battlefield cemeteries around Courcelette, Grandcourt and Miraumont. Unlike many CWGC cemeteries, where men are laid one-to-a-grave, many of the graves contain more than one burial and where two names are shown on the one headstone, it is necessary to count the individual names to find the correct grave location. The CWGC website states that Regina Trench Cemetery is located in Grandcourt but this is somewhat misleading, because while it is located between Grandcourt and Courcelette, it is most easily reached by a rough road that runs approximately 0.93 mi (1.5 km) north-west of Courcelette village.
