= 1915–1916 Bayonne refinery strikes =

Labor strike in New Jersey, US

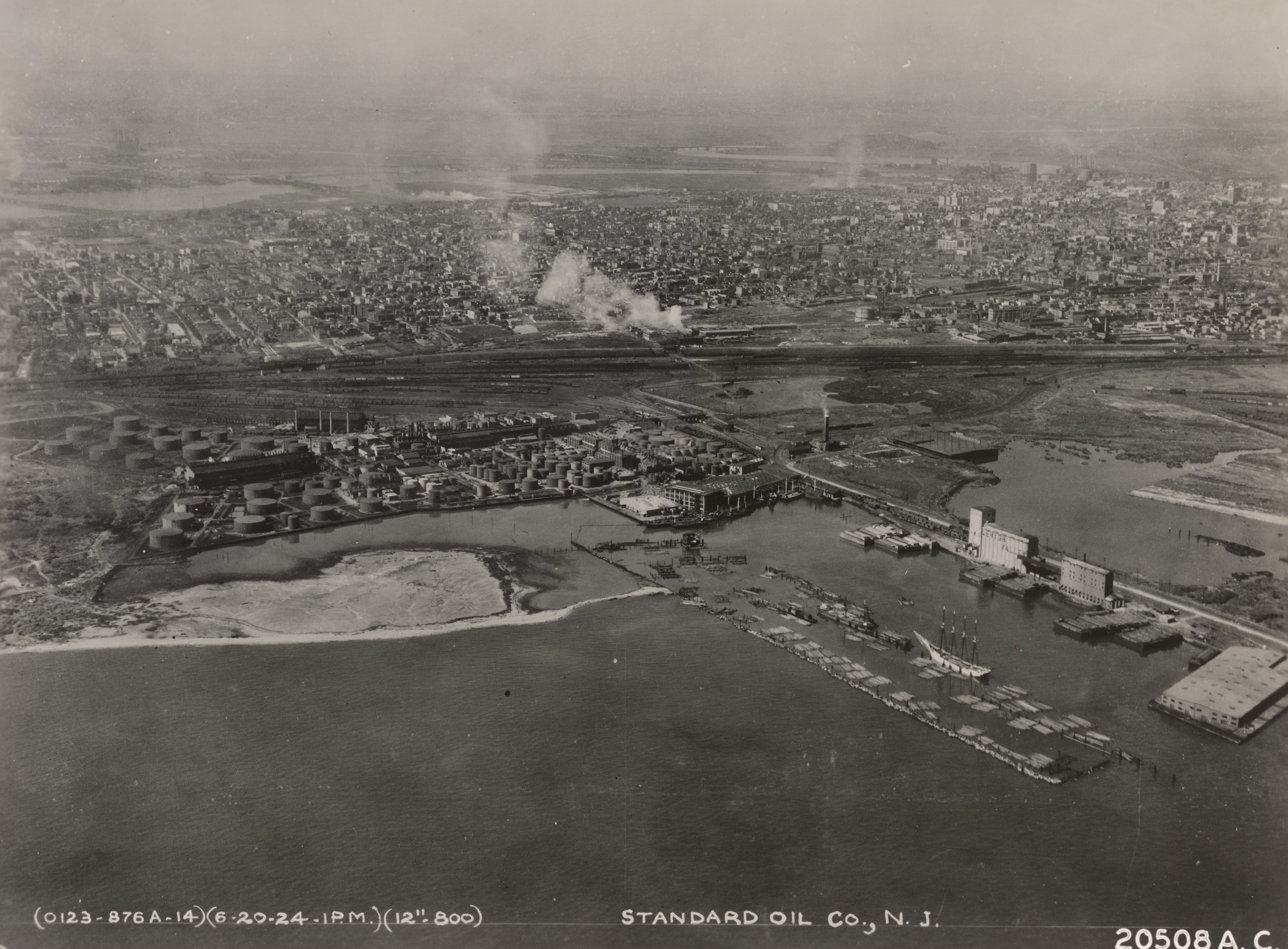
Aerial view of the refinery

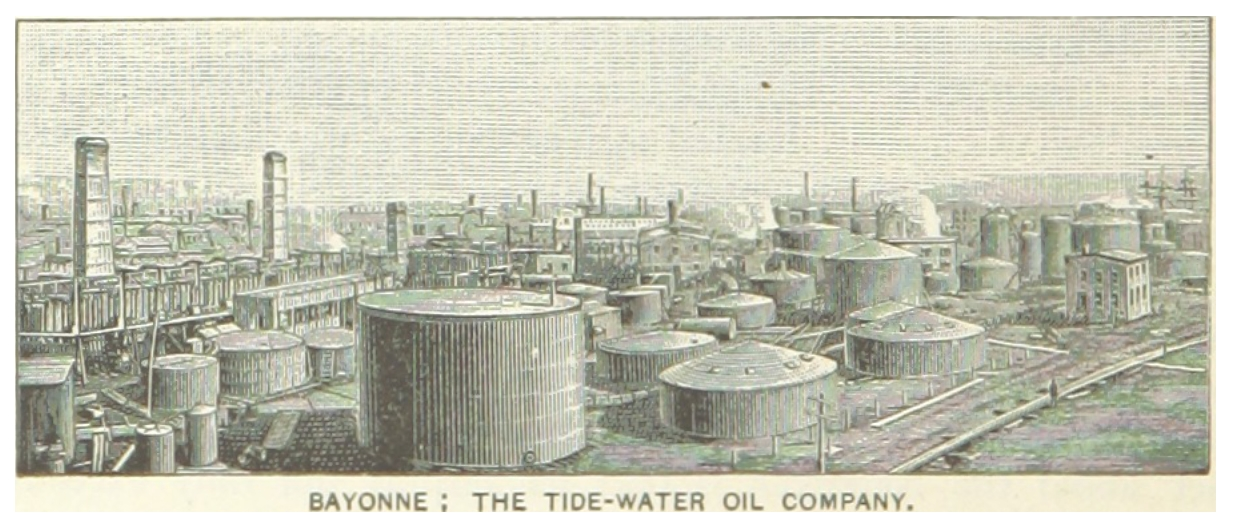
Bayonne, New Jersey - the Tidewater Oil Co. refinery complex in 1890

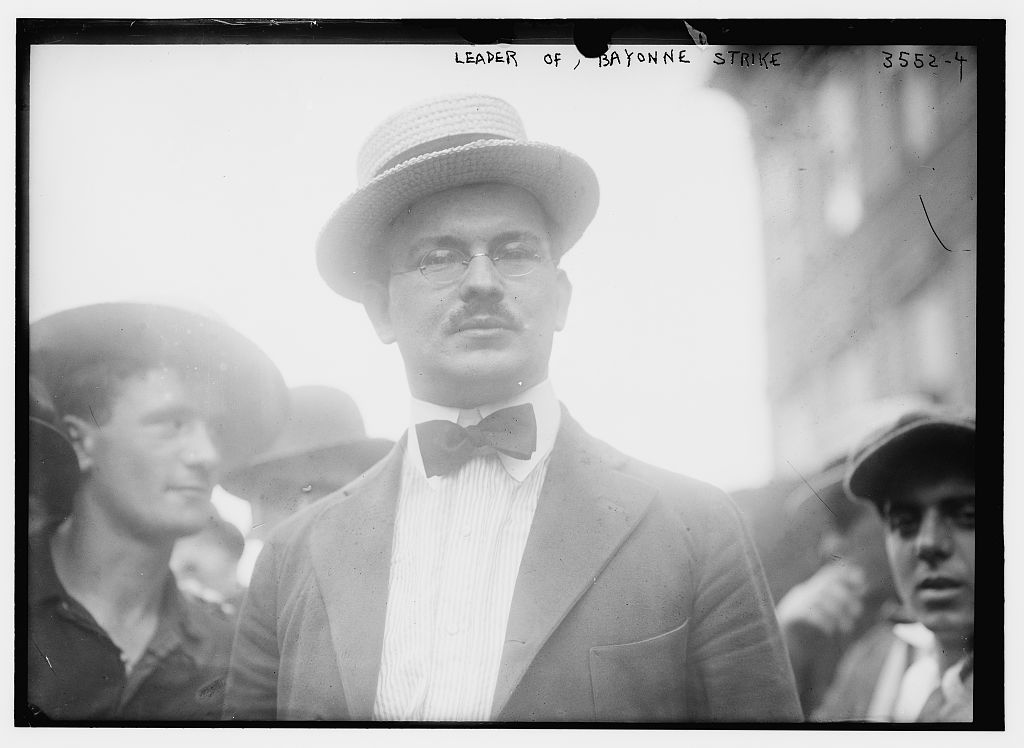
Frank Tannenbaum

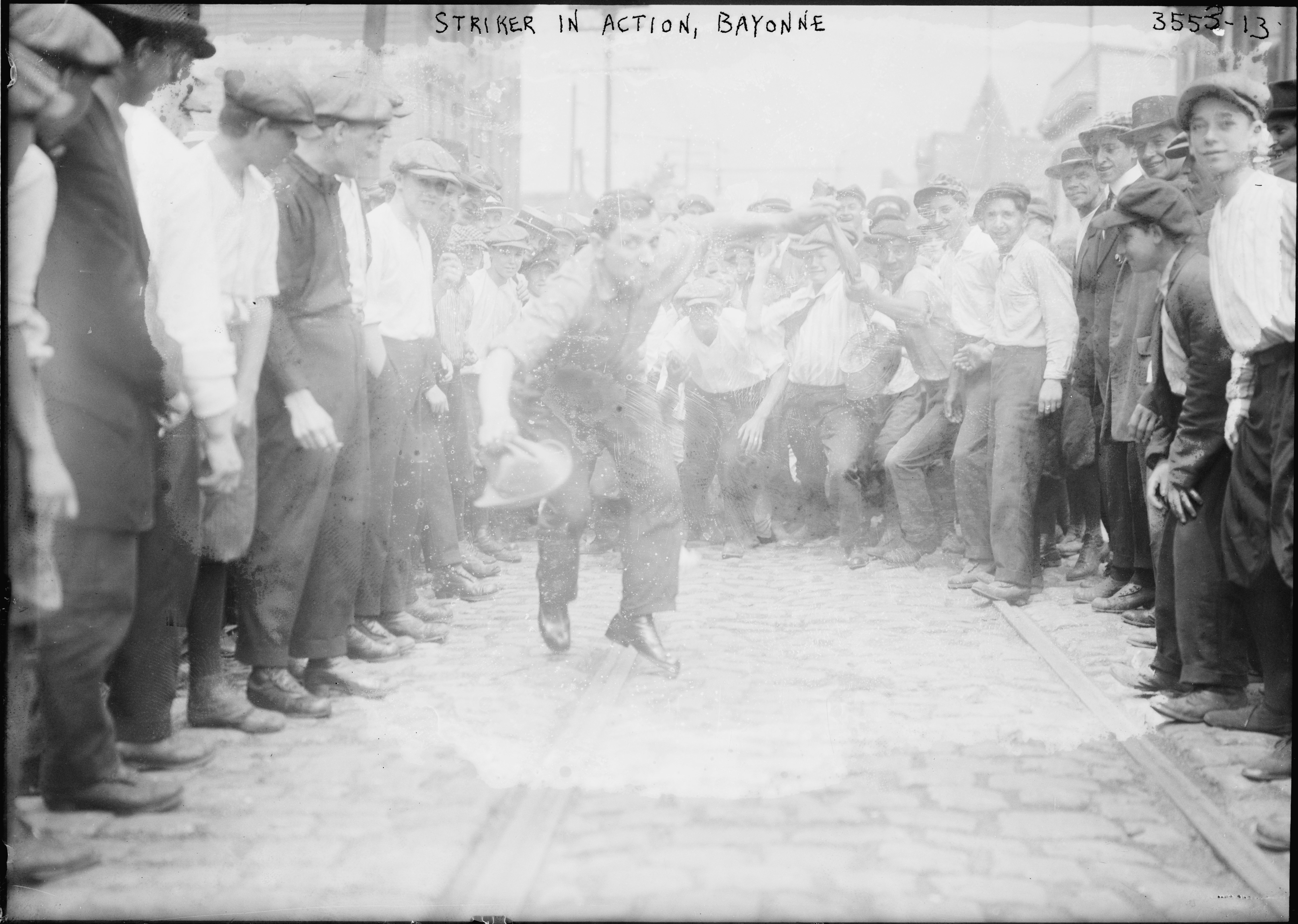
July 22, 1915

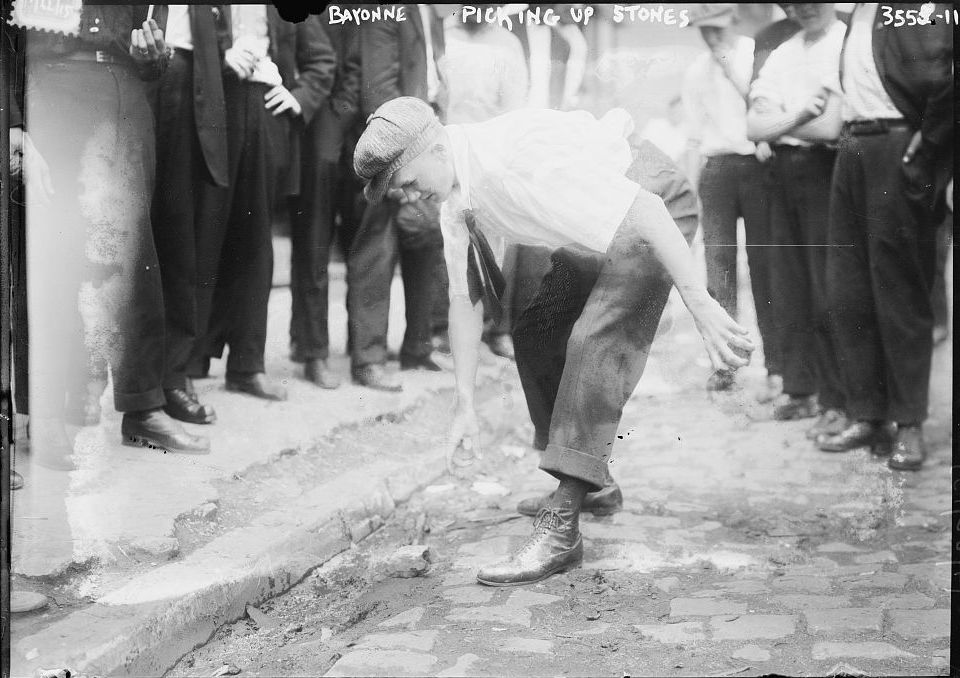
July 22, 1915

The Bayonne refinery strikes of 1915–1916 were labor actions of refinery workers in Bayonne, New Jersey, mostly Polish-Americans who struck Standard Oil of New Jersey and Tidewater Petroleum plants on Constable Hook beginning in mid-July 1915.

== The 1915 strike ==
Initially about 1200 workers walked out, including 900 coopers, when their demands for increased pay and tolerable working conditions were ignored. The company retaliated by calling in the Bayonne police force through the Mayor of Bayonne, New Jersey, Pierre P. Garven, who was simultaneously on Standard Oil's payroll as an attorney. A riot on July 20, 1915 involving the strikers, police and "several hundred women" shut down the Standard Oil plant, and caused the shooting death of 19-year-old striker John Sterancsak. Plant general manager George B. Gifford ordered 250 men from the professional strikebreaker Pearl Bergoff.

The following day a mob attacked the Tidewater refinery in an attempt to set it on fire. After several days of lawlessness, significant arson damage, at least five strikers killed altogether, and at least five more seriously wounded, Sheriff Eugene Francis Kinkead and federal labor mediators restored order after James Fairman Fielder, the Governor of New Jersey refused to call out the New Jersey National Guard. The General Superintendent of the Tidewater facility and 32 guards were arrested on a charge of inciting to riot. A total of 130 plant guards would be arrested. Saloons were closed. Local officials also arrested the Industrial Workers of the World agitator Frank Tannenbaum, who had tried to insert himself as a spokesperson for the strikers, and banned the sale of the socialist newspaper, the New York Call.

On the 28th, the workers warily returned on promises of increased pay and the institution of an eight-hour day, promises which appear to have been kept by September.

== The 1916 strike ==
Refinery workers struck Standard Oil again on October 3 through 20, 1916 for increased wages. Only thirty-six workers in the paraffin department caused thousands of other workers to join the action. Additional workers may have joined the original group of pressmen because the Standard Oil works closed down on the 10th, or when trolley lines to the adjoining Tidewater and Eagle Oil plants were blocked.

Dangerous riot conditions again took hold of the area around the plants. In a charge against police lines on the 10th, three policemen and eight workmen were shot and wounded. On the 11th, a mob of five hundred besieged police headquarters and looted saloons for liquor. Seven were shot the next day, including a woman fatally wounded as she looked out of her second-story window. Organized police action on the 13th, the tenth straight day of rioting, quelled the mob.

The strike ended on October 19 as the strikers returned to work with no concessions given. The estimated total casualties were four dead and 34 wounded, 11 of those seriously wounded.

== Aftermath ==
The Standard Oil company had long been a target of public criticism, and its conduct during the strike only intensified it. Following the strike John D. Rockefeller Jr. decided to no longer rely on an exclusively critical stance towards labor — "Whenever it shows its head, hit it" — and overhaul company policy. To this end he hired Clarence Hicks, who recommended a sweeping plan of employee benefits, including a pension plan. This approach was only partially successful, however, since labor recognized the intent of tying workers to the company and preventing strike action by including pension provisions that would penalize strike activity.

== See also ==
- Murder of workers in labor disputes in the United States
- Exxon Mobil-New Jersey Environmental Pollution Settlement
