= Le Sars =

- Commune
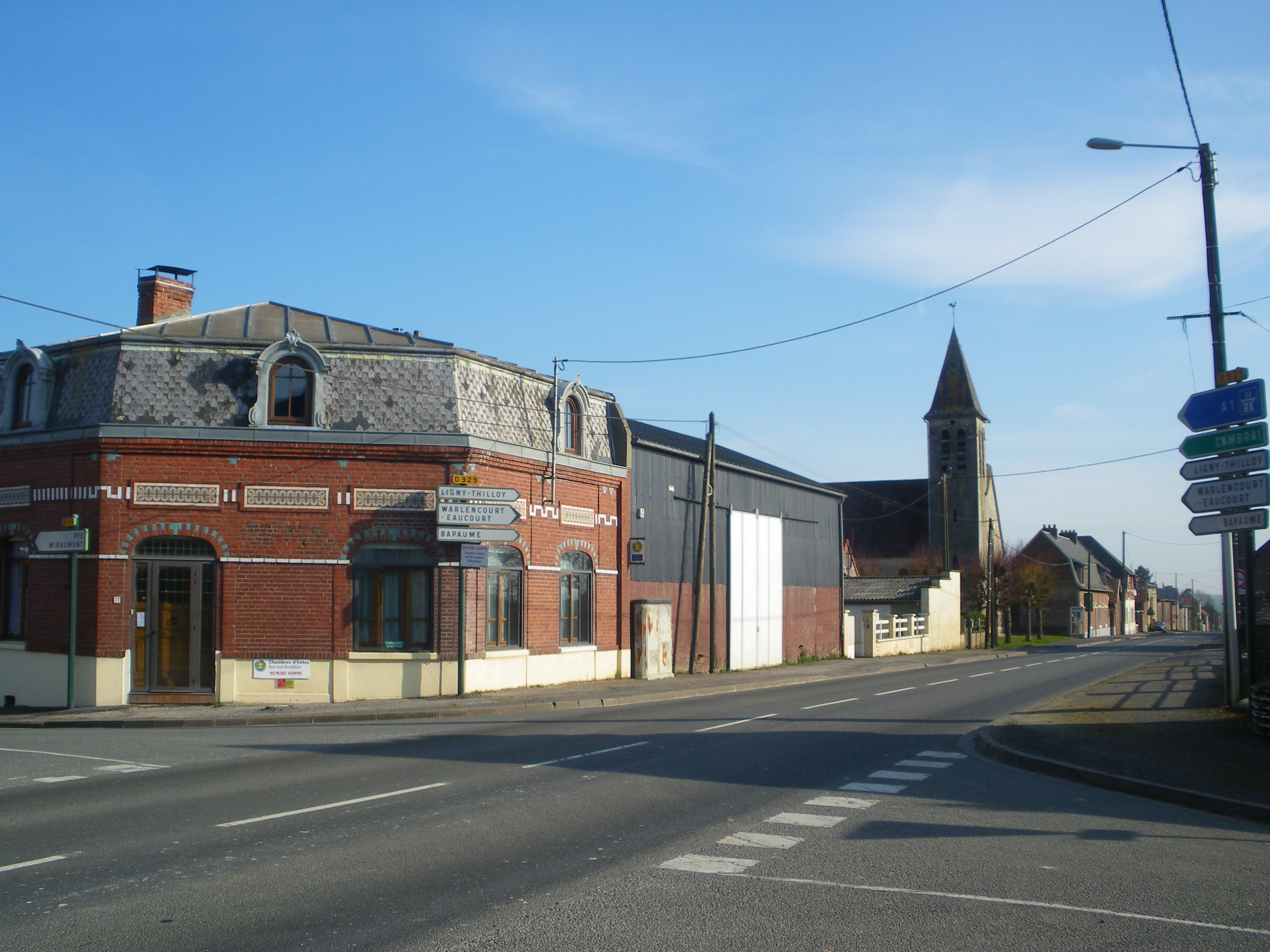
- The centre of Le Sars

- Coat of arms
- Location of Le Sars
- Location within France Location within Hauts-de-France
- Coordinates: 50°04′18″N 2°46′53″E
- Country: France
- Region: Hauts-de-France
- Department: Pas-de-Calais
- Arrondissement: Arras
- Canton: Bapaume
- Intercommunality: CC Sud-Artois

Government
  - Mayor (2020–2026): Denis Basseux
- Area^{1}: 5.11 km^{2} (1.97 sq mi)
- Elevation: 121 m (397 ft)
- Highest elevation: 133 m (436 ft)
- Lowest elevation: 96 m (315 ft)
- Population (2023): 153
  - Density: 29.9/km^{2} (77.5/sq mi)
- Time zone: UTC+01:00 (CET)
  - Summer (DST): UTC+02:00 (CEST)
- INSEE/Postal code: 62777 /62450
- ^{1} French Land Register data, which excludes lakes, ponds, glaciers > 1 km^{2} (0.386 sq mi or 247 acres) and river estuaries.

Le Sars is a commune in the Pas-de-Calais department in the Hauts-de-France region of France 16 miles (26 km) south of Arras.

== Population ==
Historical population
Year	Pop.	±% p.a.
1968	211	—
1975	178	−2.40%
1982	166	−0.99%
1990	163	−0.23%
1999	172	+0.60%
2007	176	+0.29%
2012	167	−1.04%
2017	180	+1.51%
2023	153	−2.67%
Source: INSEE

== See also ==
- Communes of the Pas-de-Calais department
