= Reserve Army (United Kingdom) =

Field army of the British Army during the First World War

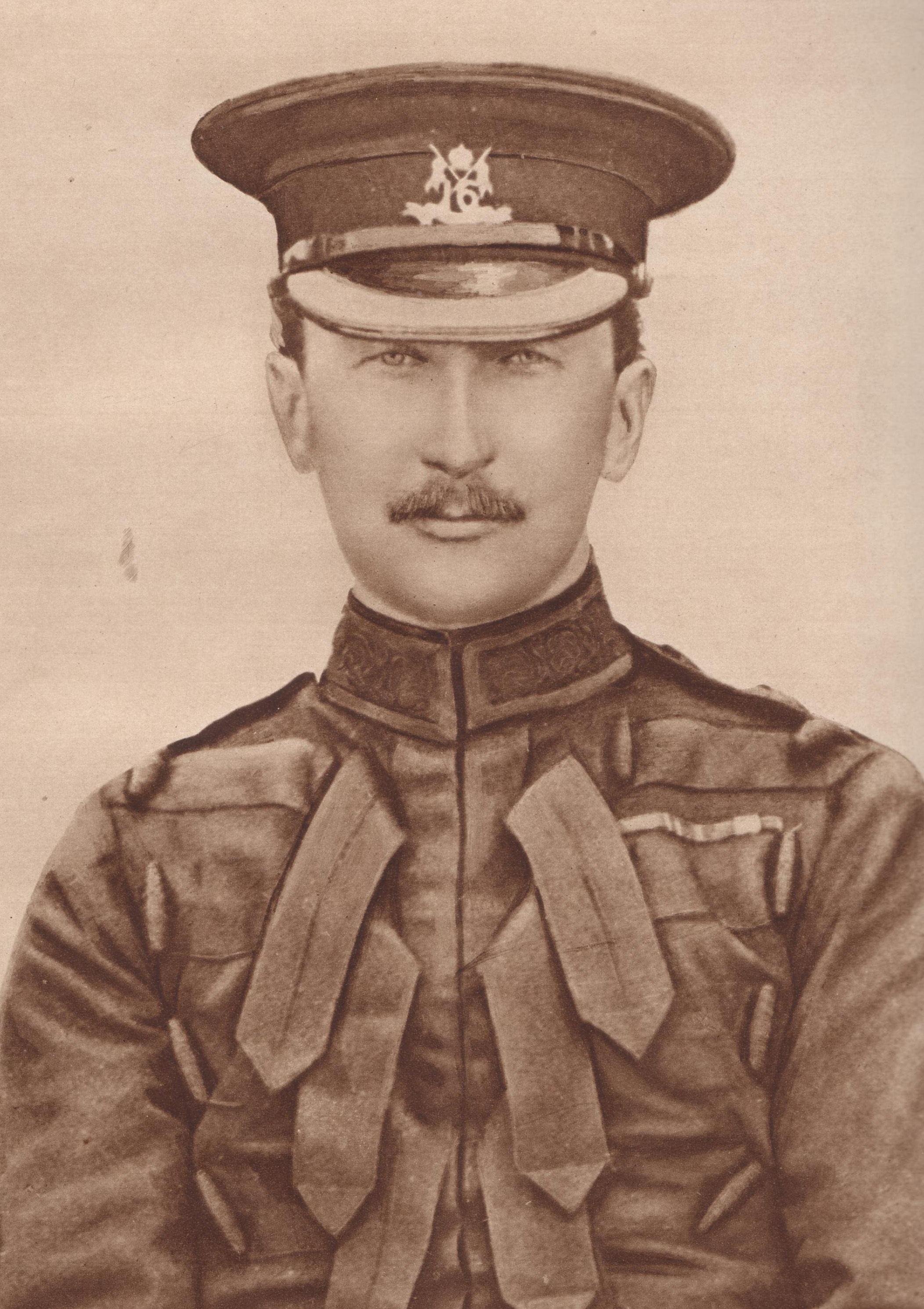
- Lieutenant-General Hubert Gough
- Active: First World War; 1916 (renamed Fifth Army 30 October 1916)
- Country: United Kingdom
- Branch: British Army
- Type: Army
- Engagements: Battle of Albert (1916); Battle of Flers–Courcelette; Battle of Thiepval; Battle of Le Transloy; Battle of the Ancre Heights; Battle of the Ancre (as the Fifth Army)

Commanders
- Notable commanders: Sir Hubert Gough

The Reserve Army was a field army of the British Army and part of the British Expeditionary Force during the First World War. On 1 April 1916, Lieutenant-General Sir Hubert Gough was moved from the command of I Corps and took over the Reserve Corps, which in June before the Battle of the Somme, was expanded and renamed Reserve Army. The army fought on the northern flank of the Fourth Army during the battle and became the Fifth Army on 30 October.

== History ==
Haig developed a concept of all-arms units of "cavalry and mobile troops" to capture a portion of the German defences and enlarge the foothold for later exploitation. Haig wrote training instructions for the cavalry in March 1916, in which he described a breach being made in the German lines and the cavalry and mobile troops rushing forward to create a bridgehead, obstructing German reinforcements. Infantry would have time to move up to relieve the cavalry in the bridgehead, which would then operate behind parts of the front where German infantry were still fighting and protect the main force by extending the flank.

On 3 March 1916 Haig distributed parts of two cavalry corps to the new Reserve Corps. The units used to form the mounted core of the Reserve Corps were the 1st Cavalry Division and the 3rd Cavalry Division. Its infantry came from two GHQ reserve infantry divisions, the 12th (Eastern) Division and the 25th Division. In November 1916, the 2nd Indian Cavalry Division was renamed and attached to the Fifth Army to give it three mounted divisions.

There was some uncertainty over the role of the army, General Kiggell, the BEF chief of staff, wrote on 4 June "The area in which the Reserve Corps [sic] may be employed must be dependent on events and cannot be foreseen". Gough was told to train the cavalry in the all-arms concept and to convince cavalry officers of the effectiveness of cavalry, when co-operating with artillery and infantry.

In 1996, Stephen Badsey wrote that the Reserve Army was organised as a conveyor belt, to exploit the success of the Fourth Army, with the 25th Division first, followed by two cavalry divisions and then the II Corps infantry divisions. Sheffield wrote that the all-arms concept was an imaginative response to the tactical problems of 1915 and anticipated post-war moves towards mobile warfare, but was ambitious, and the staff work and traffic control required to make it work, would have been a great burden on the inexperienced armies and staffs of 1916. "Gough's Mobile Army" was then made ineffective by a disagreement between Haig and Rawlinson about the plan for the Battle of the Somme, Rawlinson wanting to conduct a series of limited advances onto commanding ground, from which German counter-attacks would be smashed. The intelligence picture led Haig to believe that a more ambitious attack could succeed and he insisted on deeper objectives being substituted for the relatively shallow penetration of the German first position preferred by Rawlinson.

The army was intended to carry out the breakthrough and exploitation of the Somme offensive, once the Fourth Army (General Sir Henry Rawlinson) had captured the German front-line trenches. In May it had been envisaged that Gough would stand by to take over the two right flank corps of the Fourth Army but on 5 June, this plan was supplemented by a proposal to move the forces under Gough to the Second Army in Flanders, if the Fourth Army offensive bogged down. The idea of Gough taking over the right wing corps was dropped later in June and the 1st, 3rd and 2nd Indian cavalry divisions were attached to Gough along with the 12th and 25th divisions in GHQ reserve, to operate under the command of GHQ. II Corps with the 23rd and 38th divisions, was to be ready to move forward into the vacated assembly areas. In mid-June II Corps was detached and returned to GHQ reserve and the Reserve Army reduced to a cavalry formation, under the command of the Fourth Army, to give more discretion to Rawlinson as the man on the spot.

Battle of the Somme 1 July – 18 November 1916

In the evening of the First day on the Somme, 1 July 1916, the British Commander-in-Chief General Sir Douglas Haig relieved Rawlinson's Fourth Army of responsibility for the northern sector, placing the VIII and X Corps under Gough from 7:00 a.m. on 2 July. Gough immediately left to visit the two corps to assess the situation. X Corps and VIII Corps to the north were to capture the German front position and the intermediate line from Mouquet Farm to Serre. Gough was sent to take over command of X Corps and VIII Corps and the 25th Division (Major-General E. G. T. Bainbridge) was transferred from reserve to X Corps. Gough had intended to attack Thiepval with the 49th and 32nd divisions and the 48th Division of VIII Corps; eventually changes of plan reduced the attack to two brigades of the 32nd Division.

Just before the attack by X Corps and III Corps began on 3 July, Gough revealed that X Corps could not attack before 6:00 a.m. and at noon, VIII Corps and X Corps were detached from the Fourth Army to Gough and the Reserve Army. Later II Corps, I Anzac Corps and the Canadian Corps were added to the Reserve Army. For the next few months the Reserve Army fought the Battle of Pozières (23 July – 3 September) and the Battle of Mouquet Farm (16–26 September). The Battle of Thiepval Ridge (26–28 September took place as part of the sequential offensives of the French Sixth, the Fourth and then the Reserve Army during September. For much of October, the Reserve Army conducted the Battle of the Ancre Heights and on 30 October, the army was renamed the Fifth Army.
