= 17th Battalion, Northumberland Fusiliers =

- Active: 1914 - 1919
- Disbanded: 27 June 1919
- Country: United Kingdom
- Branch: British Army
- Type: Infantry; later Pioneer and Railway Pioneer
- Nickname(s): NER Pioneers
- Engagements: Battle of the Somme (1916) Second Battle of the Somme (1918) Battle of Arras Battle of the Hindenburg Line Final Advance in Artois

Commanders
- Known Commanders: Lieutenant Colonel M. L. Pears Lieutenant Colonel W.D.V.O. King

The 17th Battalion, Northumberland Fusiliers was one of the numerous Pals Battalions formed in the North East of England on Kitchener's call for men during the early parts of the First World War. The battalion was raised by the North Eastern Railway (NER) and was the only pals battalions to be raised by a single company.

The battalion was formed of four companies; "A", "B", "C" and "D". Two further companies, acting as reserve companies, were also formed becoming "E" and "F". "E" and "F" Companies later became the 32nd (Reserve) Battalion, Northumberland Fusiliers (see below).

From its creation until October 1916, and again from September to November 1917, the battalion was part of the 32nd Division. Between October 1916 and September 1917, and again from November 1917 to April 1918, the battalion was part of GHQ Railway Troops. Between April and May 1918, the battalion was attached to the 1st Australian Division. Between May 1918 and their demobilisation after the war, the battalion was part of the 52nd (Lowland) Division.

== Formation ==
On 8 September 1914, a circular was sent around the railway company informing staff of the proposed formation of a Pals Battalion made from the men of the NER. By 11 September, Lord Kitchener gave the formal sanction of the formation of the 17th Battalion, Northumberland Fusiliers.

Recruitment for the battalion began on 14 September at the York Railway Institute. Next day recruitment began at the Newcastle Railway Institute. Recruitment continued, alternatively between York and Newcastle, and by 23 September the battalion was almost at full strength. The battalion was moved to King George Docks at Hull, which was jointly owned by the NER and the Hull & Barnsley Railway, beginning on 22 September and the entire battalion arriving by 1 October. At this time the battalion officers were accommodated aboard the SS Rievaulx Abbey, a ship of the NER's subsidiary the Hull & Netherlands Steamship Company.

In November 1914, the battalion was posted to the East Yorkshire Coast near Easington and Kilnsea to undergo coastal defences. At this point the battalion was part of the 32nd Division. At the beginning of 1915, the battalion saw a change of role from an infantry unit to a pioneer unit. The battalion returned from the East Yorkshire coast to Hull in February 1915 where they undertook training for service overseas.

On 20 June 1915, the battalion moved from Hull to Catterick where they joined the 96th Brigade of the 32nd Division. In the later stages of August 1915, the battalion moved to Salisbury Plain where training intensified. In November, the general manager of the NER, Sir Alexander Kaye Butterworth, traveled down to Salisbury to inspect the battalion before they left for service overseas. On 20 November 1915, the battalion, apart from the Transport and Machine Gun Sections, embarked from Southampton on SS Empress Queen.

== Early Service on the Western Front ==
On arrival to France, the battalion moved to a rest camp at Le Havre. The troops were joined by the Transport and Machine Gun Sections on 24 November, and soon the battalion moved to the Somme Valley. In late November / early December, "D" Company was attached to the 51st Division in the area around Bouzincourt, with "A", "B" and "C" Companies being attached to the 18th Division near Freshencourt, this was so the battalion gained experience before moving to the trenches with the 32nd Division.

The Battalion entered the Trenches on the Western Front on 2 December 1915, here they undertook works such as drainage, wiring and building dugouts. The first man of the battalion to be killed in action was Teddy Marsden of "D" Company who was killed by an enemy shell on 23 December. The 32nd Division took control of a stretch of the front line on 2 January 1916, relieving the 51st Division. During the first two months the battalion had been in France, six members had been killed and nine injured.

St. George's Day was celebrated by the battalion, it being a tradition of the Northumberland Fusiliers. The battalion played football first, with "B" company being winners, "C" in second and "A" and "D" being equal third. The transport section undertook bareback mule wrestling, this competition being won by Private J. Mounsey. Another event was a barbed wire obstacle course where each company sent a group over the course provided only with material found in a trench.

In April 1916, "A" Company broke a record for railway laying, whilst working in Vecquemont, on one day between 0700 and 2200 the company laid one mile and thirty yards long.

== The Battle of the Somme and Railway Construction ==
The battalion was on the front line on 1 July 1916, the first day of the Battle of the Somme, their objectives, along with the rest of the 32nd Division, was to take Leipzig Redoubt and the town of Thiepval, the later of which was their main objective. The battalion was responsible for the digging of Sandra Sap as well as the digging of communication trenches. The battalion also helped wounded soldiers by transporting water to No Man's Land to members of the Highland Light Infantry. By nightfall, "D" Company was tasked with the burial of fallen soldiers. On 16 July, the battalion was withdrawn from the frontline and moved to Loos. In the 16 days the battalion was fighting, 10 non-commissioned officers (NCOs) were killed and 83 injured, with one officer reported missing and three wounded.

The battalion returned, after a period of rest near Loos, where they were designated as a Railway Pioneer unit, under the control of the director of railways, the battalion having left the 32nd Division. On 27 September, the battalion moved to the area around Acheux Wood. By November, the battalion had completed the Aveluy to Mouquet Farm line, a loop built on the Courcelles to Hebuterne line in addition to a siding at Mailly-Maillet for a rail gun. Most of this work was completed alongside the 277th Railway Company of the Royal Engineers.

== 1917 ==
In the early stages of 1917, the battalion was involved in the construction of a Light Railway Workshop at Berguette, this was completed in March.

The battalion then marched toward the Belgian border to Poperinghe, where they began work on the Great Midland Railway, a standard gauge line between Poperinghe and the Yser Canal, with the ultimate destination being decided after the Ypres Sailent offensives of 1917. During this offensive, the battalion was placed with the 18th Corps Light Railway Advance. The battalion took part in the Third Battle of Ypres, where they undertook light railway construction following units over the front line. During the battle, the battalion lost seven men and sixty-two were wounded.

At the beginning of September 1917, the battalion returned to the 32nd Division as divisional pioneers, moving to the French / Belgium coast near Ghyvelde. However, in November they were placed under the command of the chief engineer of the 18th Corps to work on road construction between St. Julien and Poelkapelle.

At Christmas 1917, the battalion had a Christmas lunch which included meat pies, plum pudding and two pints of beer for each man. Also at this time, "A" Company beat a team from the Royal Flying Corps in a football match, winning 4–0. "B" Company also had a football match, this time against a local Kite Balloon section, also of the Royal Flying Corps.

== The German Spring Offensive ==
During the early stages of 1918, the German Army implemented the German Spring Offensive. Due to this, the battalion were ordered to demolish a bridge and dismantle railway lines in the area.

On 13 April, the battalion was ordered to return to their headquarters where they received orders to move to the 1st Australian Division as divisional pioneers. On 31 May 1918, the battalion came under the control of the 52nd Division. In July, after structural changes in the Army, "D" Company was disbanded with the men moving to the remaining three companies.

In August 1918, the division was found fighting on Vimy Ridge, with the battalion remaining in reserve, other than some night work. The Allied forces began to push into the German forces during the Battle of Amiens. In September, the battalion started work on three crossings of the now dry Canal du Nord. At the start of November 1918, the battalion was working in the areas around the River Scheldt and Jard Canal, for which the battalion constructed bridges.

== After the Armistice ==
At 1100 on 11 November 1918, the armistice was signed between the Allies and Germany. At this point the division was moving along the road between Nimy and Jurbrise. After this point, the battalion began working on 'cleaning up' the area, filling in shell holes and repairing bridges.

On 26 November the battalion was assembled at Masnuy St. Jean where they undertook training to prepare men for being demobilised and returned to civilian life. Games, parades and an inter-company divisional football tournament took place in December.

A divisional parade took place on 18 January 1919, with a second ceremony was undertaken on 27 January where the battalion was issued with its King's Colours. As railwaymen were a high grade of tradesmen, the battalion demobilisation was fast compared to other units in the division. In June 1919, the battalion moved to Antwerp where they loaded onto barges bound for Boulogne, they then made their way to Newcastle.

== Return to England ==
On their return to Newcastle, the battalion was received by the Lord Mayor of Newcastle and other civil dignitories, including members of the North Eastern Railway's board of directors. A few days later the battalion ceased to exist having been demobilsed fully at Ripon.

The battalion's Colours were given to Newcastle Cathedral, where the remain on show.

Over the course of the war, four officers and sixty-three NCOs were killed, with a further thirty-eight NCOs dying of wounds, four as the result of gas and three of sickness received on duty.

== Battle Honours ==
Somme Offensive, 1916

- Battle of Albert
- Battle of Bazentin Ridge
- Battle of Ancre Heights

Fladers Offensive, 1917

- Battle of Pilckem Ridge
- Battle of Langemarck
- Second Battle of Passchendaele

The Battles of the Lays, 1918

- Battle of Hazebrouck

The Second Battle of Arras

- Battle of the Scarpe
- Battle of Drocourt-Queant Line

Breaking of the Hindenburg Line, 1918

- Battle of the Canal du Nord

The Final Advance, 1918

- Battle of Valenciennes

== 32nd Battalion ==
As part of the formation of the 17th Battalion, two reserve companies, "E" and "F", were also formed. These companies acted as a local reserve battalion, providing drafts of men to a number of different battalions as and when required, they were allocated to the 19th Reserve Brigade.

Formed in Ripon in November 1915, the battalion moved to Harrogate in December 1915, and in June 1916, they moved to Usworth near Washington.

At the beginning of September 1916, reserve battalions across were moved to a newly formed organisation, the Training Reserve. As part of this remodelling, the 32nd Battalion, Northumberland Fusiliers, became the 80th Training Reserve Battalion within the 19th Reserve Brigade.
