= List of Canadian battles during the First World War =

This is a list of battles during the First World War in which the Canadian Expeditionary Force participated.

== France and Flanders ==
Campaign	Battle	Date
	Battle of Neuve Chapelle	10 March 1915
	St. Eloi	14–15 March 1915
Second Battle of Ypres	Battle of Gravenstafel: Battle of Kitcheners' Wood	22–23 April 1915
Second Battle of Ypres	Battle of St. Julien	24 April 4 May 1915
Second Battle of Ypres	Battle of Frezenberg	8–13 May 1915
Second Battle of Ypres	Battle of Bellewaerde Ridge	24–25 May 1915
Second Battle of Artois	Battle of Aubers Ridge	9 May 1915
Second Battle of Artois	Battle of Festubert	15–27 May 1915
Second Battle of Artois	Second Action at Givenchy	15–16 May 1915
Third Battle of Artois	Battle of Loos: Action of Bois Grenier; Battle of the Hohenzollern Redoubt	25 September–19 October 1915
	Actions of St Eloi Craters	27 March–16 April 1916
	Battle of Mont Sorrel	2–13 June 1916
Battle of the Somme	Battle of Albert: First day on the Somme	1–13 July 1916
Battle of the Somme	Battle of Bazentin Ridge: Battle of Fromelles; Attacks on High Wood	14–25 July 1916
Battle of the Somme	Battle of Pozières: Battle of Mouquet Farm	1–3 September 1916
Battle of the Somme	Battle of Guillemont	3–6 September 1916
Battle of the Somme	Battle of Ginchy	9 September 1916
Battle of the Somme	Battle of Flers–Courcelette	15–22 September 1916
Battle of the Somme	Battle of Thiepval Ridge: Capture of Le Sars	26–29 September 1916
Battle of the Somme	Battle of Le Transloy	1–18 October 1916
Battle of the Somme	Battle of the Ancre Heights: Capture of Regina Trench; Capture of Stuff Redoubt	1 October–11 November 1916
Battle of the Somme	Battle of the Ancre: Capture of Beaumont-Hamel	13–18 November 1916
Battle of Arras	Battle of Vimy Ridge	9–12 April 1917
Battle of Arras	First Scarpe, 1917	9–14 April 1917
Battle of Arras	Second Scarpe, 1917: Attack on La Coulotte	23–24 April 1917
Battle of Arras	Battle of Arleux	28–29 April 1917
Battle of Arras	Third Scarpe, 1917: Capture of Fresnoy	3–4 May 1917
Battle of Arras	Affairs south of the Souchez River	3–25 June 1917
Battle of Arras	Capture of Avion	26–29 June 1917
	Battle of Hill 70	15–25 August 1917
	Battle of Messines	7–14 June 1917
Third Battle of Ypres	Battle of Pilckem Ridge	31 July–3 August 1917
Third Battle of Ypres	Battle of Langemarck	16–18 August 1917
Third Battle of Ypres	Battle of the Menin Road Ridge	20–25 September 1917
Third Battle of Ypres	Battle of Polygon Wood	26 September–3 October 1917
Third Battle of Ypres	Battle of Broodseinde	4 October 1917
Third Battle of Ypres	Battle of Poelcappelle	9 October 1917
Third Battle of Ypres	First Battle of Passchendaele: Action of 22 October 1917	12–22 October 1917
Third Battle of Ypres	Second Battle of Passchendaele	26 October–10 November 1917
	Battle of Cambrai	20 November–8 December 1917
German spring offensive	Operation Michael: St. Quentin; Actions at the Somme Crossings; First Bapaume; Rosières; First Arras; Battle of Moreuil Wood; Battle of the Avre	21 March–4 April 1918
German spring offensive	Battle of Hamel	4 July 1918
German spring offensive	Battles of the Lys: Estaires (First Defence of Givenchy, 1918); Hazebrouck; Messines (Loss of Hill 63); First Kemmel Ridge	9–17 April 1918
	Action of La Becque	28 June 1918
Hundred Days Offensive	Battle of Amiens: Actions Around Damery; Battle of the Scarpe	8–30 August 1918
Hundred Days Offensive	Second Battles of the Somme, 1918: Battle of Albert; Second Battle of Bapaume; Battle of Arras	21 August–3 September 1918
Hundred Days Offensive	Battle of the Scarpe	26–30 August 1918
Hundred Days Offensive	Drocourt-Queant Canal	2–3 September 1918
Hundred Days Offensive	Battle of Havrincourt	12 September 1918
Hundred Days Offensive	Battle of Épehy	18 September 1918
Hundred Days Offensive	Battle of the Canal du Nord	27 September – 1 October 1918
Hundred Days Offensive	Fifth Battle of Ypres	28 September – 2 October 1918
Hundred Days Offensive	Battle of St Quentin Canal: Beaurevoir Line	29 September – 5 October 1918
Hundred Days Offensive	Battle of Cambrai	8–9 October 1918
Hundred Days Offensive	Battle of Courtrai	14–19 October 1918
Hundred Days Offensive	Battle of the Selle	17–25 October 1918
Hundred Days Offensive	Battle of the Lys and the Escaut: Battle of Valenciennes; Capture of Mons	1–11 November 1918
Hundred Days Offensive	Battle of the Sambre	4 November 1918
Hundred Days Offensive	Passage of the Grande Honnelle	5–7 November 1918

== Other theatres of war ==
- Gallipoli Campaign, 1915–16
- Macedonian front, 1915–1917
- Sinai and Palestine Campaign, 1915–16, 1918
- North Russia Intervention, 1918–19
- Persian Campaign, 1918–19
- Siberian Intervention, 1918–19
