= Maurice Loraine Pears =

British Army officer

Maurice Lorain Pears, CMG (c. 1872 – 20 October 1916) was a British Army officer who acted as the Commanding Officer of the 17th Battalion, Northumberland Fusiliers, during the first half of World War I.

== Early life ==
Pears was the eldest son of M.E. Pears, ISC and the grandson of Major-General Sir Thomas Pears.

== Military career ==
=== Pre-Great War ===
Pears joined the Cameronians (Scottish Rifles) and saw service in the Tirah campaign as a Lieutenant.

Pears was promoted from Second Lieutenant to Lieutenant on 14 January 1893. He was promoted to Captain on 18 March 1899.

Pears served with his regiment through the Second Boer War in South Africa. He later became a Staff Captain for Railways at the Army Headquarters. He was back with his regiment in January 1903, but four months later was seconded from the Cameronians to the Colonial Office in May 1903, before returning to Cameronians full-time again in October 1905.

=== Great War ===
At the time of the outbreak of the First World War, Pears was in East Africa but returned to the UK. Pears was a member of the Reserve of Officers and on his recall, he was gazetted to the North Eastern Railway Pals Battalion - the 17th Battalion, Northumberland Fusiliers. After serving time as Adjutant, he was made Commanding Officer on 13 December 1914.

The battalion was trained in Hull and on the East Yorkshire Coast before moving to France as part of the 32nd Division on 20 November 1915.

The battalion endered the Trenches from 2 December 1915, where they undertook work as a pioneer unit. In the early stages of 1916, the battalion started work as a Railway Pioneer unit, laying railway lines near Vecquemont.

Pears was made Companion of St. Michael and St. George on 3 June 1916, and was Mentioned in dispatches on 13 June 1916.

Pears was present with his battalion on the first day of the Battle of the Somme, 1 July 1916.

Pears was taken seriously ill in August 1916, when he returned to England. He was succeeded as battalion commanding officer by Major (later Lieutenant Colonel) W.D.V.O. King.

Pears died on 20 October 1916. He is buried in Brighton (Extra-Mural) Borough Cemetery.
