= Canton of Amiens-3 =

Coordinates: 49.90°N 2.30°E

Amiens-3
- Canton
- Interactive map of Amiens-3
- Country: France
- Region: Hauts-de-France
- Department: Somme
- No. of communes: {{{nbcomm}}}
- Population (2023): 27,947
- INSEE code: 80 08

The Canton of Amiens-3 is a canton situated in the department of the Somme and in the Hauts-de-France region of northern France.

== Geography ==
The canton is organised around the commune of Amiens in the arrondissement of Amiens.

== Composition ==
At the French canton reorganisation which came into effect in March 2015, the canton was expanded from 2 to 8 communes:

- Amiens (eastern part)
- Aubigny
- Bussy-lès-Daours
- Camon
- Daours
- Lamotte-Brebière
- Rivery
- Vecquemont

== See also ==
- Arrondissements of the Somme department
- Cantons of the Somme department
- Communes of the Somme department
