= Camon, Somme =

Camon
- Commune
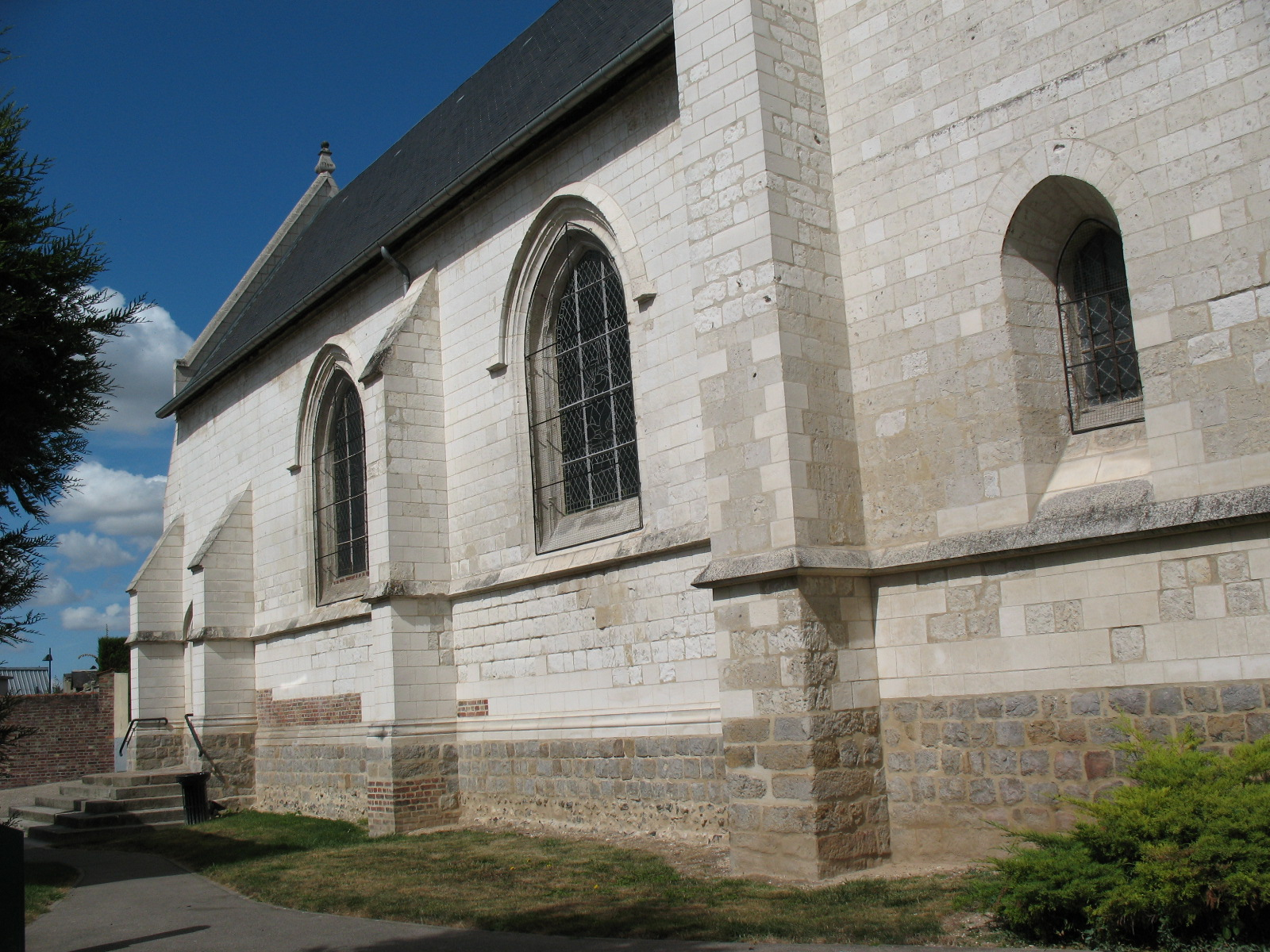
- The church in Camon

- Coat of arms
- Location of Camon
- Location within France Location within Hauts-de-France
- Coordinates: 49°53′16″N 2°20′48″E
- Country: France
- Region: Hauts-de-France
- Department: Somme
- Arrondissement: Amiens
- Canton: Amiens-3
- Intercommunality: Amiens Métropole

Government
  - Mayor (2020–2026): Jean-Claude Renaux
- Area^{1}: 12.9 km^{2} (5.0 sq mi)
- Elevation: 30 m (98 ft)
- Highest elevation: 84 m (276 ft)
- Lowest elevation: 22 m (72 ft)
- Population (2023): 4,359
  - Density: 338/km^{2} (875/sq mi)
- Time zone: UTC+01:00 (CET)
  - Summer (DST): UTC+02:00 (CEST)
- INSEE/Postal code: 80164 /80450
- ^{1} French Land Register data, which excludes lakes, ponds, glaciers > 1 km^{2} (0.386 sq mi or 247 acres) and river estuaries.

Camon (French pronunciation: [kamɔ̃]; Picard: Canmon) is a commune in the Somme department in Hauts-de-France in northern France.

== Geography ==
The commune lies on the right bank of the river Somme, east of Amiens.

== Population ==
Historical population

Year	Pop.	±% p.a.
1936	1,800	—
1946	1,764	−0.20%
1954	1,830	+0.46%
1962	2,110	+1.80%
1968	3,008	+6.09%
1975	4,350	+5.41%
1982	4,214	−0.45%

Year	Pop.	±% p.a.
1990	3,920	−0.90%
1999	4,366	+1.20%
2007	4,572	+0.58%
2012	4,444	−0.57%
2017	4,432	−0.05%
2023	4,359	−0.28%

Source: EHESS and INSEE (1968-2023)

== See also ==
- Communes of the Somme department
