= Lamotte-Brebière =

- Commune
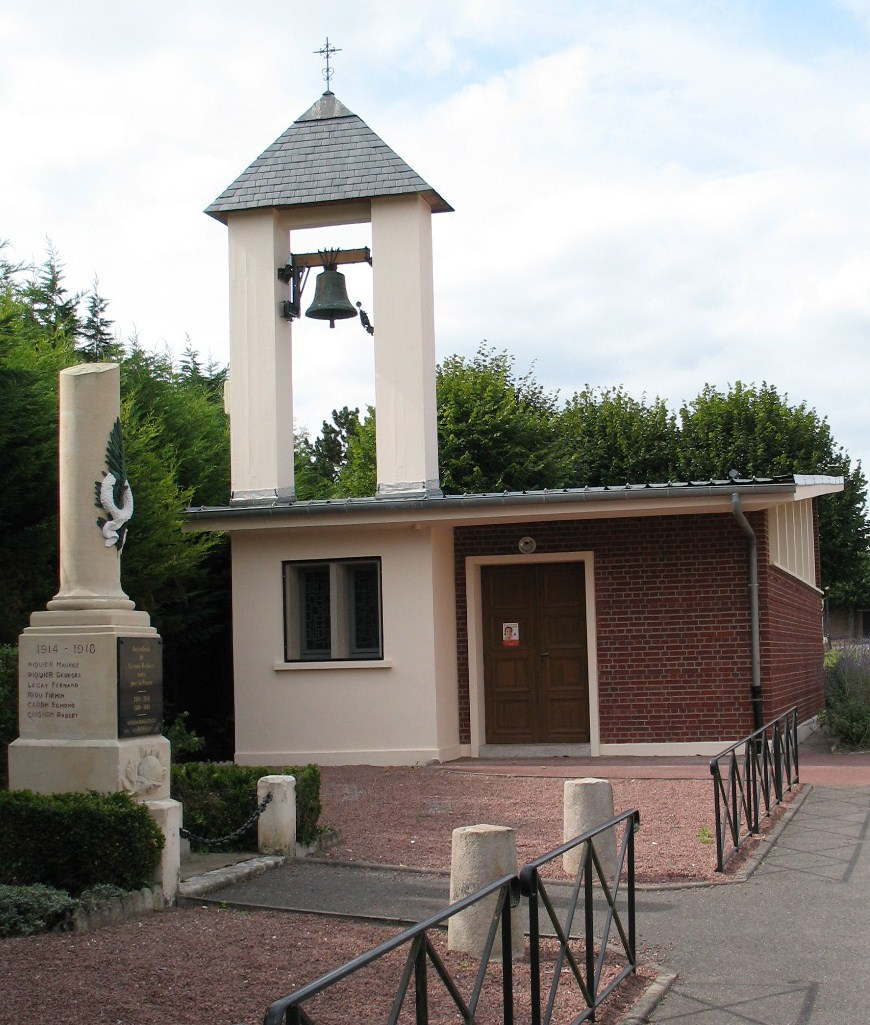
- The church in Lamotte-Brebière
- Location of Lamotte-Brebière
- Location within France Location within Hauts-de-France
- Coordinates: 49°53′10″N 2°23′28″E
- Country: France
- Region: Hauts-de-France
- Department: Somme
- Arrondissement: Amiens
- Canton: Amiens-3
- Intercommunality: Val de Somme

Government
  - Mayor (2020–2026): Philippe Van Vynckt
- Area^{1}: 4.25 km^{2} (1.64 sq mi)
- Elevation: 66 m (217 ft)
- Highest elevation: 70 m (230 ft)
- Lowest elevation: 22 m (72 ft)
- Population (2023): 260
  - Density: 61/km^{2} (160/sq mi)
- Time zone: UTC+01:00 (CET)
  - Summer (DST): UTC+02:00 (CEST)
- INSEE/Postal code: 80461 /80450
- ^{1} French Land Register data, which excludes lakes, ponds, glaciers > 1 km^{2} (0.386 sq mi or 247 acres) and river estuaries.

Lamotte-Brebière (French pronunciation: [lamɔt bʁəbjɛʁ]; Picard: L’Motte-Brebière) is a commune in the Somme department in Hauts-de-France in northern France.

== Geography ==
The commune is situated on the D1b road, some 3 miles (5 km) east of Amiens, by the banks of the river Somme.

== Population ==
Historical population
Year	Pop.	±% p.a.
1968	132	—
1975	180	+4.53%
1982	200	+1.52%
1990	215	+0.91%
1999	242	+1.32%
2007	212	−1.64%
2012	236	+2.17%
2017	222	−1.22%
2023	260	+2.67%
Source: INSEE

== See also ==
- Communes of the Somme department
