= Second Battle of the Somme =

1918 battle on the Western Front of World War I

Coordinates: 50.016666°N 2.800000°E

Second Battle of the Somme (1918)
- Part of the Western Front of World War I
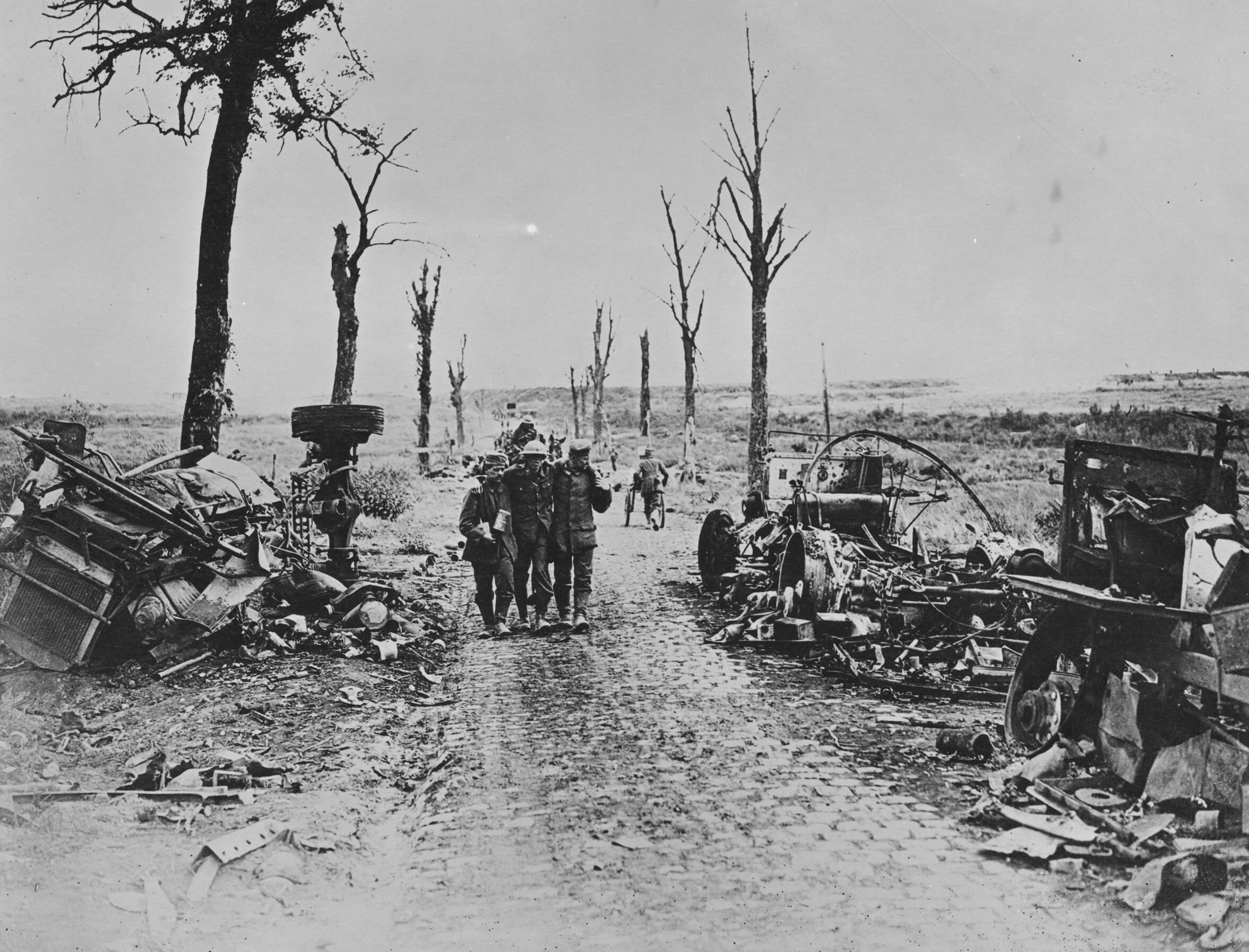
- German soldiers supporting an injured Canadian soldier during the Second Battle of the Somme
Date	21 August – 3 September 1918
Location	Somme River, France
Result	Allied victory

Belligerents
United Kingdom and Empire: Canada; Australia; New Zealand; United States	Germany

Commanders and leaders
(United Kingdom of Great Britain and Ireland) Douglas Haig (United Kingdom of Great Britain and Ireland) Henry Rawlinson (Canada) Arthur Currie (Australia) John Monash	(German Empire) Erich Ludendorff

Strength
(United Kingdom of Great Britain and Ireland) British Third Army (United Kingdom of Great Britain and Ireland) British Fourth Army; United States II Corps	German Second Army

Casualties and losses
(United States) 11,500 casualties (Canada) 5,600 casualties	"Heavy", 6,000 taken prisoner

The Second Battle of the Somme of 1918 was fought during the First World War on the Western Front from late August to early September, in the basin of the River Somme. It was part of a series of successful counter-offensives in response to the German Spring Offensive, after a pause for redeployment and supply.

The most significant feature of the two 1918 Somme battles was that with the failure of the first 1918 Somme Battle (not to be confused with the 1916 Battle of the Somme) having halted what had begun as a large German offensive, the second formed the central part of the Allies' advance to the Armistice of 11 November.

== Battle ==
On August 15, British field marshal Douglas Haig refused demands from Supreme Allied Commander Marshal Ferdinand Foch to continue the Amiens offensive, as that attack was faltering as the troops outran their supplies and artillery, and German reserves were being moved to the sector. Instead, Haig began to plan for an offensive at Albert.

The British Third Army, with the United States II Corps launched the next phase of the campaign with the Battle of Albert on 21 August. The assault was widened by French and then further British forces in the following days. During the last week of August, the Allied pressure along a 110-kilometre (68 mi) front against the enemy was heavy and unrelenting. From German accounts, "Each day was spent in bloody fighting against an ever and again on-storming enemy, and nights passed without sleep in retirements to new lines."

The second battle began on 21 August with the opening of the Second Battle of Bapaume to the north of the river itself. That developed into an advance which pushed the German Second Army back over a 55 kilometre front, from south of Douai to La Fère, south of Saint-Quentin, Aisne. Albert was captured on 22 August. On 26 August, the British First Army widened the attack by another twelve kilometres, sometimes called the Second Battle of Arras. Bapaume fell on 29 August. The Australian Corps crossed the Somme River on the night of 31 August, and broke the German lines at the Battle of Mont St. Quentin and the Battle of Péronne. The British Fourth Army's commander, General Henry Rawlinson, described the Australian advances of 31 August – 4 September as the greatest military achievement of the war.

On the morning of 2 September, the Canadian Corps seized control of the Drocourt-Quéant line (representing the west edge of the Hindenburg Line). The battle was fought by the Canadian 1st Division, 4th Division, and by the British 52nd Division. Heavy German casualties were inflicted, and the Canadians also captured more than 6,000 unwounded prisoners. Canada's losses amounted to 5,600. By noon that day the German commander, Erich Ludendorff, had decided to withdraw behind the Canal du Nord.

Faced with these advances, on the German Oberste Heeresleitung ('Supreme Army Command') issued orders to withdraw in the south to the Hindenburg Line. This ceded without a fight the salient seized the previous April. According to Ludendorff, "We had to admit the necessity ... to withdraw the entire front from the Scarpe to the Vesle."

By 3 September, the Germans had been forced back to the Hindenburg Line, from which they had launched their offensive in the spring.

On their way to the Hindenburg Line, in a fierce battle, the Canadian troops, led by General Sir Arthur Currie, overcame the earthworks of the incomplete Canal du Nord during the Battle of Canal du Nord.

Following, in late September-early October, during the Battle of St. Quentin Canal, British, Australian, and American troops under the command of Australian general John Monash were able to breach the Hindenburg Line. Soon after, the Canadians breached the Hindenburg Line at the Battle of Cambrai.

== See also ==
- List of Canadian battles during World War I
- Hundred Days Offensive (1918)
