= Capture of Stuff Redoubt =

- Part of The Battle of the Somme, First World War
- Battle of the Somme 1 July – 18 November 1916
Date	1 July, 27 September – 9 October 1916
Location	Picardy, France 50°3′16.3″N 2°41′18.2″E
Result	British victory

Belligerents
British Empire	Germany

Commanders and leaders
Douglas Haig	General Erich von Falkenhayn
- Stuff Redoubt (Staufen Feste)

The Capture of Stuff Redoubt (Feste Staufen) was a tactical incident during the Battle of the Somme in 1916. The redoubt had been built as part of the fortification of the Somme front by the German 2nd Army (General der Infanterie Fritz von Below) after the open warfare of 1914. On 1 July, the First Day on the Somme, troops of the 36th (Ulster) Division occupied part of the redoubt before being forced out by German counter-attacks. British troops were not able to reach the redoubt again until the Battle of Thiepval Ridge (26–28 September) when parties of the 11th (Northern) Division captured part of the redoubt. The rest of the redoubt was taken by the 25th Division during the Battle of the Ancre Heights (1 October – 11 November).

Some German officers thought that the blow to German morale was worse than news of the fall of Thiepval. The loss of the redoubt and the success of an attack by II Corps on Stuff Trench, beyond the redoubt, on 21 October exposed the Ancre valley and Grandcourt to British ground observation. The army group commander Crown Prince Rupprecht and Erich Ludendorff, the deputy Chief of the General Staff of the German army, wanted to retire from the salient that had formed from Saint-Pierre-Divion and Beaumont-Hamel but Below preferred to hold on since the remaining positions were strong and on high ground with good observation. The last big attack by the Reserve Army (renamed Fifth Army on 30 October) the Battle of the Ancre (13–18 November) against these positions was a great success.

== Background ==
=== Somme front, 1914–1915 ===
The 26th (Württemberg) Reserve Division (Generalmajor Franz von Soden) of the XIV Reserve Corps (Generalleutnant Hermann von Stein), arrived on the Somme in late September 1914, attempting to advance westwards towards Amiens. By 7 October, the advance had ended and temporary scrapes had been occupied. Fighting in the area from the Somme north to the Ancre, subsided into minor line-straightening attacks by both sides. The primacy of artillery had been established during the fighting of 1914 and the exploitation of artillery fire power in defensive fighting, required means of communication between the front line and artillery positions in the rear. Artillery organisation needed to be centralised to make sure that all guns in range engaged targets.

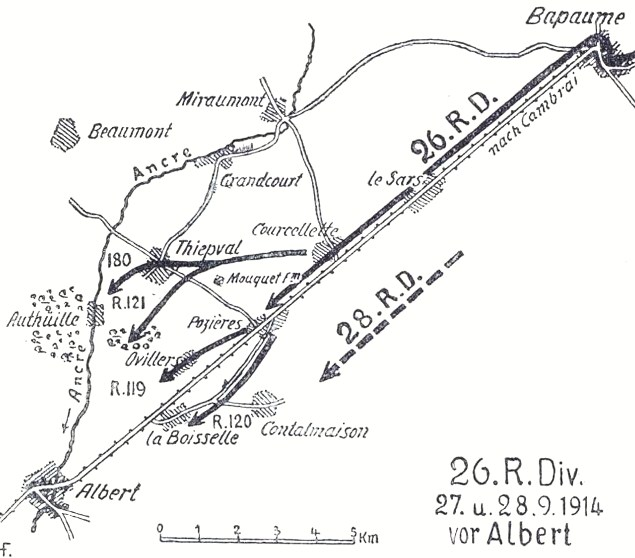
Diagram of the 26th (Württemberg) Reserve Division and the 28th (Baden) Reserve Division attacks towards Albert, late September 1914

In late December 1915, Major Bornemann, commander of the 26th Division field artillery, wrote a report in which he described failures of communication, which led to an advantage created by the blowing of a mine being squandered by the artillery. Bornemann wrote that artillery battery observation posts had been left unmanned, on the assumption that they had been superseded by artillery liaison officers in the front line. Reporting had been inadequate due to complacency and reports should have been circulated to all headquarters rather than individual officers assuming that the information had been communicated. The artillery should avoid settling into routine firing, since prisoners had reported that its predictability made it easy to evade and limiting firing to the area in front of batteries should cease and oblique firing into adjacent sectors begin, to ensure that British artillery could not fire with impunity from the flanks. Concentrations of fire consumed too much ammunition on local targets and should be limited to provide ammunition for firing on other targets to disrupt British operations and to reassure German infantry that they would not be abandoned by the artillery.

Bornemann also wrote that retaliatory fire should be prompt and authority to order fire should be shared by all artillery officers, rather than relying on unreliable communications to request authority to fire on targets as they were observed. As an example, he recommended that if a British artillery battery was detected, it should be engaged with 200 rounds immediately. Co-operation with artillery observers in aircraft and balloons should be improved, with at least one target selected for bombardment in every aircraft sortie, for which the artillery commanders should make gridded drawings of targets within range. When British aircraft were overhead, battery positions should cease fire to remain hidden and German aircraft units should be contacted to drive the British away. Bornemann suggested that artillery group commanders should have control of all artillery ammunition allotted to the group and that artillery regimental headquarters should be responsible for replacing stocks and passing on demands for more ammunition to higher headquarters.

=== Somme fortifications, 1915 ===
On the Western Front, General Erich Falkenhayn Chief of the General Staff at Oberste Heeresleitung (OHL) instituted a construction plan in January 1915, by which the western armies would be provided with field fortifications, built to a common system to economise on infantry, while offensive operations were conducted on the Eastern Front. Barbed-wire obstacles had been enlarged from one belt 5–10 yd (4.6–9.1 m) wide to two belts 30 yd (27 m) wide and about 15 yd (14 m) apart. The front line had been increased from one trench to three, 150–200 yd (140–180 m) apart, the first trench (Kampfgraben) to be occupied by sentry groups, the second (Wohngraben) to accommodate the front-trench garrison and the third trench for local reserves.

The trenches were to be traversed and have sentry-posts in concrete recesses built into the parapet. Dugouts were to be deepened from 6–9 ft (1.8–2.7 m) to 20–30 ft (6.1–9.1 m), 50 yd (46 m) apart and large enough for 25 men. An intermediate line of strong points (the Stützpunktlinie) about 1,000 yd (910 m) behind the front line was also built. Communication trenches were to be dug back to the reserve position, renamed the second position, which was as well-built and wired as the first line. The second position was built beyond the range of Allied field artillery, to force an attacker to stop and move field artillery forward before assaulting the line.

German artillery was organised in a series of sperrfeuerstreifen (barrage sectors); each infantry officer was expected to know the batteries covering his section of the front line and the batteries ready to engage fleeting targets. A telephone system was built, with lines buried 6 ft (1.8 m) deep for 5 mi (8.0 km) behind the front line, to connect the front line to the artillery. The Somme defences had two inherent weaknesses which the rebuilding had not remedied. The front trenches were on a forward slope, lined by white chalk from the subsoil and easily seen by ground observers. The defences were crowded towards the front trench, with a regiment having two battalions near the front trench system and the reserve battalion divided between the Stützpunktlinie and the second line, all within 2,000 yd (1,800 m) of the front line.

=== 1916 ===
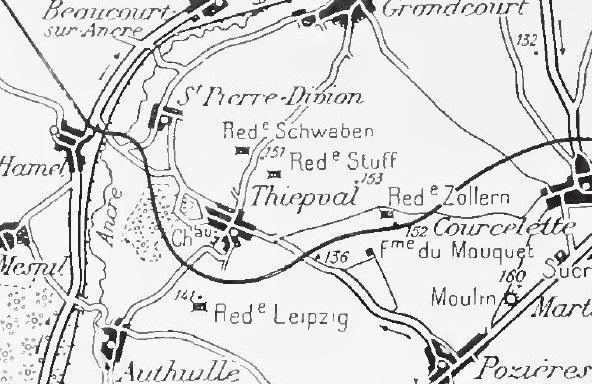
Vicinity of Stuff Redoubt, 1916

After the Herbstschlacht (Autumn Battle) in Champagne during late 1915, a third line another 3,000 yd (1.7 mi; 2.7 km) back from the Stützpunktlinie was begun in February 1916 and was nearly complete when the Battle of the Somme began. More fortifications were built, especially in the intermediate, second and third positions, near the Schwaben and Grallsberg redoubts. Stuff Redoubt (Staufen-Feste) was in the second position, north-west of Zollern (Goat) Redoubt, also in the second position and east of Schwaben Redoubt. Beyond the redoubt was Stuff Trench (Staufen Riegel) on the far slope, which led from Schwaben Redoubt eastwards to Stuff Redoubt and on to Courcelette. The redoubt was about halfway between Pozières and Grandcourt.

New battery positions were built to accommodate artillery reinforcements, dugouts were deepened and extra exits were added. Engineers sited and designed new trenches and stringently inspected the building work performed by the infantry. In early March 1916 and from 15–19 May, the chief engineer of the 2nd Army inspected the first position in the area of the 26th Reserve Division, who found that only in the area north of the Ancre, were there enough shell-proof concrete posts. On 12 May, the 2nd Guard Reserve Division was moved out of reserve, to defend Serre and Gommecourt, which reduced the frontage of the XIV Reserve Corps and its six divisions from 30,000–18,000 yd (17–10 mi; 27–16 km) between Maricourt and Serre, making the average divisional sector north of the Albert–Bapaume road 3.75 mi (6.04 km) wide, while the frontages south of the road were 4.5 mi (7.2 km) wide. By July 1916, the German front line from Thiepval to St Pierre Divion was obstructed by sixteen rows of barbed wire and the second line lay behind five rows. Shell-proof dug outs 30 ft (9.1 m) deep, could accommodate all of the trench garrison.

== Prelude ==
=== 1 July ===
==== Morning ====
Weather (23 June – 1 July 1916)
Date	Rain mm	Temp ( °F)	
23	2.0	79–55	wind
24	1.0	72–52	dull
25	1.0	71–54	wind
26	6.0	72–52	dull
27	8.0	68–54	dull
28	2.0	68–50	dull
29	0.1	66–52	dull wind
30	0.0	72–48	dull wind
1	0.0	79–52	fine

At 7:15 a.m., the 36th (Ulster) Division troops formed up in no man's land and moved to within 150 yd (140 m) of the German front trench. The artillery and mortar bombardment lifted off the front trench at 7:30 a.m. and the Irish advanced steadily, crossing the front trench with few losses but then the German counter-barrage fell on the rear of the first line and the support companies. As soon as the British guns stopped, machine-gun fire from Thiepval cemetery caught the third support battalion on the left flank. The foremost infantry pressed on, reached the B line at 7:48 a.m. and took a large number of prisoners but German troops emerged from dugouts in the A line behind the 108th Brigade, whose moppers-up had been killed by machine-gun fire. The leading waves continued to advance, reached the C line and then the corner of Schwaben Redoubt at 8:48 a.m., by when the supporting battalion survivors had occupied their objectives but cross-fire from German machine-guns then prevented movement forwards or backwards.

Reserve Infantry Regiment 99 (RIR 99) of Reserve Infantry Brigade 52 (General von Auwäter), holding the line north of Thiepval, was broken through and the attackers rushed Schwaben Redoubt. The garrison, a support company standing by to reinforce the front defences, was surprised and surrendered after brief resistance. The centre battalion of RIR 99 had been destroyed in the breakthrough and 500 men taken prisoner. An attack towards the Grandcourt Line ran into the British barrage and defensive fire from German guns on the north side of the Ancre near Miraumont and from Gruppen Berta and Adolf, either side of the Ancre. German machine-gunners in Grandcourt and Feste Alt Württemberg (Beaucourt Redoubt) opened fire and the troops tried to dig in or fell back to Schwaben Redoubt and the Hansa Line, which ran from the redoubt down the north edge of the ridge to the Ancre.

The left hand battalion of RIR 99 had repulsed the attack on Thiepval but the centre and right, from the village to the Ancre south of St Pierre Divion, had been overrun, the troops having been trapped underground and taken prisoner. Observers in the Grandcourt Line were unable to see the breakthrough because of smoke and dust in the air. Only when the British advanced on the Grandcourt Line, was the identity of the troops that could be seen in the area discovered. As soon as the British bombardment lifted, the only reserves nearby, the recruit battalion of IR 180 and a machine-gun company, occupied the Grandcourt Line around Thiepval.

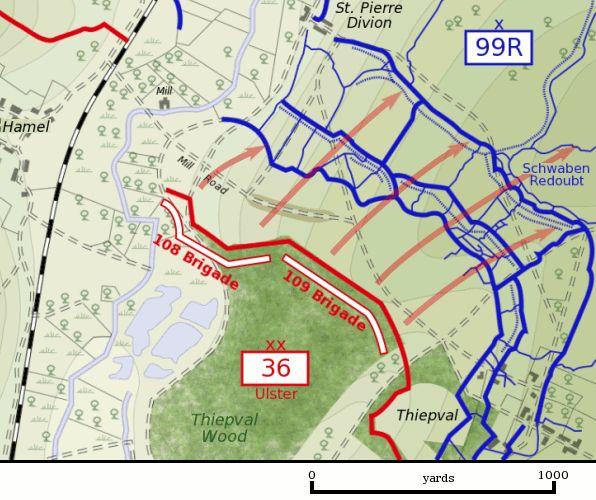
The British attack of 1 July 1916. Schwaben Redoubt is at centre right.

By 10:00 a.m. runners had reported the fall of the C line but because of the defeats of the 32nd Division on the right flank at Thiepval and the VIII Corps divisions on the north bank of the Ancre, Nugent tried to get permission to cancel the 107th Brigade attack on the D line but was over-ruled, as new attacks were being arranged on the flanks. About 45 minutes later, X Corps HQ ordered the advance to stop until the situation on the flanks was clearer but the stop order failed to reach the 107th Brigade, which advanced for about 1,000 yd (910 m) in a "wild and desperate venture", before the survivors were repulsed from the objective by German troops in the D line (Grandcourt Trench). German counter-attacks on the left flank from St Pierre Divion, were forced back several times by the remaining men of the three battalions on the left flank; on the right flank, Mouquet Switch Trench was reconnoitred and found empty.

An attack from Schwaben Redoubt was met by machine-gun fire but a party of about fifty men reached a trench near Stuff Redoubt, finding it empty and about 200 men reached an artillery position in a fold known as Artilleriemulde (Boom Ravine), in front of the Grandcourt Line and more troops arrived 300 yd (270 m) to the north. By 10:00 a.m. the breakthrough on the 26th Reserve Division front had made Thiepval vulnerable to an attack from the redoubt, which would make the village untenable. Soden ordered Auwäter to recapture the redoubt and sent a battalion of Bavarian Reserve Infantry Regiment 8 (BRIR 8) in reinforcement. Auwäter ordered the counter-attack to begin immediately by three groups, from the north-east, east and south-east, to forestall an Irish wheeling movement against Thiepval and Ovillers. II Battalion, BRIR 8 (Major Roesch) comprising Group 3 was to attack from Stuff Redoubt but delays caused to message runners and the British bombardment delayed the advance from Irles.

==== Afternoon ====
Crews of 4 Squadron Royal Flying Corps (RFC) observed the attack of the 36th Division beyond the German front line, where it was out of view from the British lines. At 2:00 p.m., an observer reported that German artillery from Grandcourt to Courcelette, was retiring and at 4:30 p.m., that there was no sign of German troops massing against the redoubt. After an hour, the 36th Division was reported still to be holding The Crucifix, south-east of the redoubt. The rest of the counter-attack force was ordered not to wait and Oberstleutnant Bram reached Stuff Redoubt to command the attack during the afternoon, having had to move on foot via Courcelette through the British bombardments. Moving around the redoubt was difficult due to the number of shells that had been fired into the area, tearing up the ground, the maze of trenches and the constant British barrage. Bram found an intact observation post and from it saw British troops just in front of the second position and troops of the 5th Company, BRIR 8 and Machine-Gun Marksman Detachment 89 (M-GMD 89). Groups 1 and 2 were nearly ready to attack but Group 3 was still struggling forward, the 8th Company going astray into the 51st Brigade area. Bram set up headquarters on the steps of a dug out full of wounded but could see little from Stuff Redoubt because of smoke and dust. Bram set the counter-attack for 4:00 p.m. and managed to liaise with Major Bayerköhler the Group 2 commander and the local artillery commander.

At 3:40 p.m. orders sent by another officer, reached the 2nd Recruit Company which attacked the Hansa Stellung (Hansa Position) independently but was seen by Bayerköhler who ordered Group 2 to join in. The 9th and 10th Company BRIR 8 were to remain in Zollern Redoubt as a defence force and the rest of the men were to assemble around Stuff Redoubt, made most difficult by the constant British artillery-fire. The attack was met by machine-gun fire, bogged down and Bayerköhler was killed. Soden sent more orders to Bram to attack immediately but movement for both sides was extremely difficult and they were cut off from reinforcements. Bram reported at 7:39 p.m. that the 36th Division was across Auwärter Trench and the Thiepval–Grandcourt road facing east. Orders had been issued but contact had been lost with Group 1, Group 3 was still invisible and no reserves remained to counter-attack Schwaben Redoubt. Parties had been sent out to find the I and III battalions of BRIR 8 and reinforcements were requested.

The three recruit companies of IR 180 advanced in lines, from Grandcourt, along the lower slopes of the ridge, to the Hansa Stellung and then began to bomb up the line towards Schwaben Redoubt. The British troops in Artilleriemulde were overrun and captured or killed. In the centre, the counter-attack began from Staufen-Feste (Stuff Redoubt), with three companies of BRIR 8 but was promptly engaged by British artillery and forced under cover. The advance was continued along Hessen Weg, which led from Courcelette to Thepval and then moved into the open opposite the south-eastern corner of Schwaben Redoubt. The fourth company of the battalion had been intended to move along Hessen Weg, so joined the other three companies. By 6:00 p.m., troops in the original front line near St Pierre Divion, had bombed southwards and recovered some of the captured front line. The advance up the Hansa Stellung had reached the north face of the redoubt and then been repulsed.

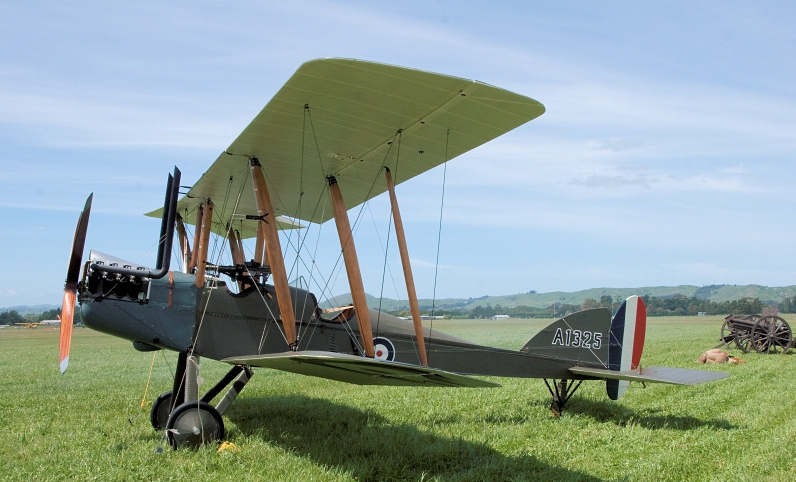
B.E.2f A1325 (2009)

By 7:00 p.m. another rush on the south-eastern corner by IR 180 failed and more piecemeal attacks from all round the redoubt were driven off, with many casualties. Messages were sent back to the 26th Division headquarters for a bombardment and at 9:00 p.m., the divisional artillery began to fire on the redoubt, from the north-east to the south-east for one hour. The German infantry attacked again, supported by two battalions of IR 185, which had arrived from reserve at Beugny at about 10:00 p.m. and attacked from Stuff and Zollern (Goat) redoubts. In costly hand-to-hand fighting, the Germans recaptured the redoubt in about thirty minutes, finding it strewn with about 700 Irish dead. By midnight the ridge had been re-occupied and two more battalions of IR 180 had arrived and moved to the Hansa Line and the redoubt, available to reinforce the front line from Thiepval to the Ancre.

Troops were sent forward by the 52nd Reserve Infantry Brigade; I Battalion, IR 185 stayed in Stuff Redoubt as a reserve and then took over the second position south of Grandcourt and the II Battalion IR 185 took over from Stuff Redoubt to sector Süd IV (South 4). As II Battalion, BRIR 8 arrived, the troops had been sent forward piecemeal and gradually began to overwhelm the defenders, much assisted by better artillery support, which by 10:00 a.m. made the Irish hold on Schwaben Redoubt untenable. The final attack began an hour later by bombing along trenches against the handful of survivors still able to fight. The Germans took about 100 prisoners and found about 700 dead. Bram continued to work in Stuff Redoubt, organising the dispatch of ammunition, supplies, water and reinforcements.

=== British offensive preparations ===
==== September ====
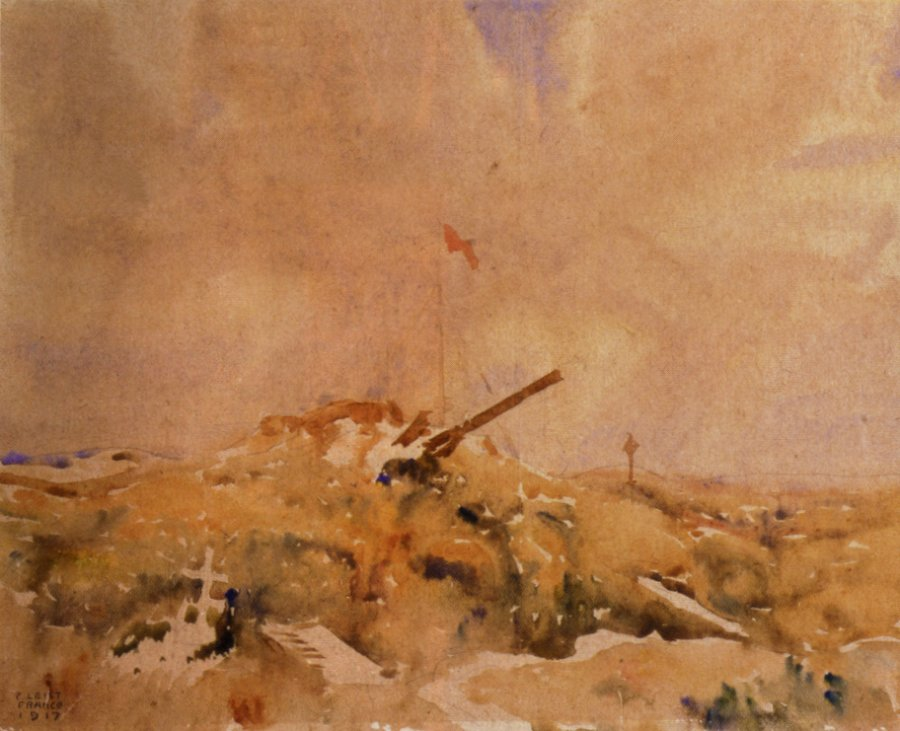
Mouquet farm, Pozières, by Fred Leist

On the right flank of II Corps (Lieutenant-General Claud Jacob), the 11th (Northern) Division (Lieutenant-General Charles Woollcombe) was to capture Hessian Trench on top of the ridge and Stuff Redoubt; if possible patrols were to be sent forward to take Stuff Trench. The 34th Brigade (Brigadier-General J. Hill) on the right would have to capture Mouquet Farm, advance up the old German second position trenches to Zollern Redoubt and thence to Stuff Redoubt. Two tanks were attached, to move from positions west of Pozières, arrive at Mouquet Farm at zero hour and then drive north onto the second position. On 28 September the Reserve Army issued instructions that Stuff and Schwaben redoubts were to be captured by 29 September and Stuff Trench on 1 October.

==== October ====
On 30 September on the II Corps front, the 7th Brigade (Brigadier-General Cranley Onslow) and the 75th Brigade (Brigadier-General Ernest Pratt) relieved the 74th Brigade and the 11th (Northern) Division by 1 October. On the right flank, there was observation over the Grandcourt valley but further to the left, the Germans still held the ridge from Stuff Redoubt. At the redoubt, the southern face was held by the British and the northern face by the Germans. Preparations began, amidst rain and mud, for the capture the rest of the redoubt and higher ground just beyond to gain observation over the Grandcourt valley. Communication trenches were dug and deep dugouts excavated for the attacking infantry. The bad weather caused a postponement but the attack was eventually set for 9 October.

== Battle ==
=== 26 September ===
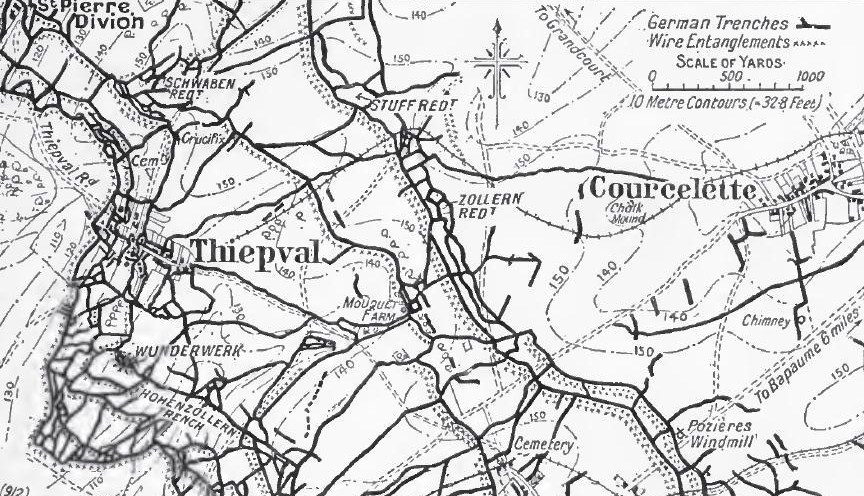
Map of German defensive fortifications from Thiepval to Courcelette, July 1916

West of the Canadian Corps, II Corps attacked with the 11th (Northern) and 18th (Eastern) divisions. The 11th (Northern) Division advanced with the 34th Brigade on the right, which attacked with two battalions; a bombing party rushed forward to Mouquet Farm thirty seconds before zero to guard the dugout exits. Both battalions got to their first objective, a line either side of the German second position south of Zollern Redoubt, with few losses. The rear waves were nearly caught by the German counter-barrage but the 5th Dorset, moving up in support to the British front line was hit and had many casualties, including the four company commanders. The leading battalions had a ten-minute pause to clear the trench and send back prisoners; the advance began again into small-arms fire from Hessian Trench, Zollern and Stuff redoubts. The right-hand battalion became bogged down fighting through Zollern Redoubt against IR 93, the attack collapsed and most of the moppers-up were killed. About 50 survivors dug in on the right facing Zollern Trench, while others found cover in shell-holes to the west of the second position.

The left battalion was caught by machine-gun fire from Zollern Redoubt and Midway Line; the right flank units were almost annihilated. The battalion reached Midway Line, which ran from Mouquet Farm to Schwaben Redoubt north of Thiepval, which was defended by six trench mortars. An officer and a few soldiers pressed on to Zollern Trench, the west end of which linked Zollern Redoubt to Thiepval and got a foothold. The Germans in Zollern Redoubt and Zollern Trench had held on with the support of an artillery barrage, until the Canadian Corps advance on their left flank outflanked the position and then the remaining defenders made their way back to Stuff Trench, defined as the new main line of defence, behind the remaining advanced positions. The 5th Dorset had reached High Trench and parties joined up with the survivors of the two attacking battalions. Smoke from the German bombardment reduced visibility and movement in the open had been impossible because of German return fire. Reports arrived before 1:30 p.m. that the second objective had been captured and after other exaggerated reports, a party of Vickers gunners and part of the 86th Field Company RE were ordered to the north end of Zollern Redoubt to consolidate. The commanders of the two attacking battalions went forward to investigate and found scattered groups of men in an empty battlefield, with German machine-gun fire coming from Zollern Redoubt and Mouquet Farm.

==== Mouquet Farm ====
Weather (23–30 September 1916)
Date	Rain mm	Temp ( °F)	
23	0	66–43	fine
24	0	72–45	mist sun
25	0	73–50	fine
26	0.1	75–54	fine
27	0.1	72–52	dull wet
28	1	73–54	fine rain
29	17	61–54	wet wind
30	0	63–41	fine dull

The fighting at the farm continued in the rubble, some troops of the 11th Manchester in brigade reserve having relieved the attacking battalion. The two attached tanks had ditched short of the farm but one crew dismounted machine-guns from their tank and joined the attack on foot. A party of the 5th Dorset arrived and troops from the 6th East Yorkshire (Pioneers) were sent forward. At 5:30 p.m. the last 56 Germans of the 6th Company, IR 165 (8th Division) surrendered after being attacked with smoke bombs. When dark fell the area was chaotic, little accurate information having reached the brigade and divisional headquarters, where it was believed for a time that the final objective had been reached. While waiting for news, the 5th Dorset was sent forward to consolidate Zollern Redoubt and gain touch with the Canadians on the right. The commander began to assemble the scattered companies just south of the redoubt; by then the 11th Manchester had got three companies into the German front line in Hessian Trench and a little beyond. (Note: The 33rd Brigade on the left attacked from Nab Valley with two battalions, reached Joseph Trench at 12:45 p.m. and advanced to Schwaben Trench between Mouquet Farm and the east end of Thiepval, where they dug in. Zollern Trench was reached by 1:30 p.m. and Hessian Trench by 4:00 p.m., except for the 250 yd (230 m) on the right. Touch was gained on the left with the 18th (Eastern) Division at Zollern Trench and Midway Line was mopped up by a reserve battalion which also reinforced Hessian Trench, repelling a German counter-attack on the right.)

=== 27 September ===
The 11th (Northern) Division sent forward orders to resume the attack at 10:00 a.m.; officer patrols had gone forward to find the location of units but it took until dawn to discover the situation on the 34th Brigade front. At 6:30 a.m. it had been found that Zollern Redoubt was empty and the survivors of the battalion nearby were eventually collected and withdrawn. On the west side of the redoubt the attacking battalion and some troops from the 5th Dorset got into Zollern Trench up to Midway Line and the 11th Manchester, in the trench on the east side of Zollern Redoubt, linked with the Canadians on the right. The 11th Manchester was to advance and occupy Stuff Redoubt (apparently abandoned by the Germans) and then take Hessian Trench. As soon as it was daylight an extensive German bombardment began and the advance of the 11th Manchester was stopped by machine-gun fire from Stuff Redoubt and Hessian Trench, which turned out to be occupied by three companies of IR 93 two from I Battalion, IR 165 and two from III Battalion, IR 153.

After a noon conference, Woollcombe ordered another attack at 3:00 p.m. but the 34th Brigade was exhausted and the 32nd Brigade was ordered to send forward from reserve the 9th West Yorkshire and the 6th Green Howards, to continue the attack and clear up the ground as they advanced to Stuff Redoubt and Hessian Trench. The battalions were moving up when orders of a postponement to give more time for preparation were sent forward. The news failed to reach the 9th West Yorkshire, which arrived at the jumping-off line in Zollern Trench on the east side of Stuff Redoubt, just after 3:00 p.m. and attacked, despite there being no sign of the Green Howards on the left. The British barrage lifted as soon as the advance was noticed and the battalion, which had not seen the ground before, dodged to the left, round the wreckage of shell-holes and mud filled trenches. Despite return fire from the Germans, the troops reached the south side of Stuff Redoubt and gained a footing.

The Green Howards attacked an hour later at the new Zero Hour, without the artillery barrage, which had been fired at the original time. The defenders of Hessian Trench to the west of the redoubt were surprised and captured, a field artillery brigade firing in support of the Howards as soon as they were seen to advance. The Green Howards took 80 prisoners and two machine-guns for minor losses and gained touch with the 33rd Brigade on the left and with the West Yorkshires in the redoubt on the right. Parties from two battalions acted as ammunition carriers and at 9:00 p.m. the 11th Manchester bombed forward along a trench from Zollern Redoubt, towards the Canadians to the north-east. The 33rd Brigade on the left of the division attacked eastwards during the morning, linked with the 34th Brigade and at 3:00 p.m., the rest of Hessian Trench was occupied.

=== 28–30 September ===
The 32nd Brigade took over from the 34th Brigade on the right of the 11th (Northern) Division, ready to take the rest of Stuff Redoubt, in concert with the West Yorkshire and Green Howard battalions in the south face and in Hessian Trench, to link with the Canadians at 6:00 p.m., with two companies of the 8th Duke of Wellington's (Dukes), which had got into Zollern Trench. The Dukes were delayed by German artillery bombardments and congestion in the trenches and the attack was delayed. Later on a party in Stuff Redoubt bombed forward on the right flank, captured the north side of the Redoubt and gained ground further on but this was later abandoned, when the party ran out of ammunition during German counter-attacks. The 33rd Brigade sent patrols forward towards Stuff Trench, which was found to be full of German troops. IR 153 recorded later that isolated troops were pushed back to Stuff Trench.

On 29 September, the 8th Canadian Brigade, (3rd Canadian Division) attacked at noon with the 32nd Brigade of the 11th (Northern) Division on the left flank. A Stokes mortar bombardment was arranged as well as the usual creeping barrage and three companies of the 6th York and Lancaster reached Hessian Trench, most of which was captured. Touch was gained with the Canadians but a 200 yd (180 m) length of trench on the left, next to Stuff Redoubt, was not captured. The troops still in the redoubt attacked the north side again and almost ejected the last of the garrison before running out of hand grenades. The survivors had to retire to the south face, where they repulsed a German counter-attack in the evening. The British attacks made it impossible for the 8th Division to be relieved until 30 September. The 32nd Brigade had run out of fresh battalions and the 7th South Staffordshire of the 33rd Brigade was sent forward as a reinforcement.

On 30 September, the II Corps resumed its attacks, intended to expel the Germans from their positions in Hessian Trench with converging attacks by 11th (Northern) Division bombers, after a preliminary bombardment. At 4:00 p.m., a 6th York and Lancaster bombing party advanced west along Hessian Trench, the 7th South Staffordshire attacked up Zollern Trench to the support line of the old German second position and the troops in the south face of Stuff Redoubt attacked again. The attacks gained ground against determined German resistance and by nightfall the division had taken its objectives, except for the north side of the redoubt. Canadian bombers assisted the capture of Hessian Trench and during the night, the 33rd Brigade and the 32nd Brigade began to be replaced by the 25th Division (Major-General Guy Bainbridge).

=== 9–13 October ===
==== Stuff Redoubt ====
Weather (1 October – 11 November 1916)
Date	Rain (mm)	Temp (°F)	
8	0.1	64–54	rain
9	0	64–50	fine
10	0	68–46	fine sun
11	0.1	66–50	dull
12	0	61–55	dull
13	0	61–50	dull
14	0	61–50	dull

At 12:35 p.m. the 10th Battalion Cheshire Regiment (10th Cheshire) attacked Stuff Redoubt, with D and B companies forward, advancing behind an "intense" barrage, with C Company in support and A Company in reserve. By 12:42 p.m. captured the north face of the redoubt and pushed advanced posts forward to the north-east and the old second position trenches but failed to reach the Mounds, the final objective on the high ground to the north. The battalion took 127 prisoners from RIR 111 (28th Reserve Division) and counted 50–60 German dead. Two counter-attacks in the evening were defeated by artillery and machine-gun fire. The 7th Brigade relieved the 10th Cheshire with the 8th Battalion, Loyal North Lancashire Regiment for another attack on 10 October to take the Mounds. The Germans counter-attacked again on 11 October and during the evening of 12 October, a German counter-attack by a Stoßtrupp supported by a flame-thrower detachment, managed to re-capture the north-west corner of Stuff Redoubt but was then forced out with many casualties; 13 October was quiet.

==== The Mounds ====
On 14 October, the 25th Division attacked the Mounds, north-west of Stuff Redoubt, with the 8th Loyal North Lancs of the 7th Brigade. At 2:40 p.m., a German barrage ended on the British line; A and B companies attacked on time at 2:46 p.m. and advanced close behind a dense creeping barrage the 200 yd (180 m) to the objective, reaching the Mounds with few casualties. (German prisoners later said that the preparations had been seen but their commander apparently refused to believe that an attack was imminent and ordered the German bombardment to cease at 2:40 p.m.) The battalion took 101 prisoners of II Battalion, RIR 111 and several machine-guns. Observation over the Grandcourt valley was from all along the ridge was obtained and a line of observation posts was built down the slope.

=== Air operations ===
Balloon observers reported 64 German batteries firing in the 24 hours before the attack on 26 September and pinpointed the positions of 103 more. The artillery bombarded 22 battery positions under the direction of artillery-observation aircraft and a force of about 1,000 German troops seen near Miraumont was scattered by artillery directed by a 4 Squadron crew. The attack was observed by the crews of 4 Squadron and 7 Squadron RFC who reported that the infantry had hugged the creeping barrage, overrun Mouquet Farm and pressed on to Zollern Redoubt and beyond to Hessian Trench as observation crews took photographs of the area. The IV and V brigades RFC dropped 135 20 lb (9.1 kg) bombs on German trenches, artillery and infantry billets. The III Brigade attacked the German airfield at Lagnicourt and its 60 Squadron attacked observation balloons with Le Prieur rockets, shot down two in flames and attacked several balloons on the ground with phosphorus bombs and a headquarters at Barastre was bombed by 19 Squadron. Two German aircraft were shot down and four more damaged by RFC offensive patrols but the pilots found that the faster German aircraft often refused battle. A 70 Squadron Sopwith 1½-Strutter of a formation of six aircraft was shot down over Bapaume in a dogfight with six German aircraft.

On 27 September the RFC found many German formations airborne until a downpour began. Six aircraft of 27 Squadron were attacked by five aircraft of Jagdstaffel 2 (Jasta Boelcke), which shot down three of the British aircraft and damaged another. Another 1½-Strutter of 70 Squadron was lost to a German fighter during an early morning reconnaissance and no German aircraft were shot down. A German balloon lost its mooring and drifted from Bapaume towards Ypres, with the observer trying to surrender to RFC aircraft as they intercepted but it was shot down and the observer taken prisoner. Next day air operations continued but 29 September was washed out. On 30 September, 500 photographs were taken and crews flying at low altitude over the battlefield studied the condition of the German wire and trenches. The advance of the Reserve Army deprived the Germans of observation to the south and it became more important to deny the Germans opportunities for air observation to compensate. The British Nieuport 16 fighters remained a match for the newer, faster, German aircraft and began to escort bomber formations.

During another attack on Lagnicourt aerodrome, German pilots got airborne and attacked the bombers and fought with the escort of Nieuports and FE 2bs. Three German fighters were shot down for the loss of an FE. The growing menace of the new German fighters led to proposals to increase the number of fighter squadrons from four to eight per army. On 21 October, a German counter-attack at Schwaben Redoubt was repulsed and a British attack which had been prepared for the afternoon, caught the Germans still recovering and captured its objectives, assisted by contact patrols and artillery observation by 4 and 7 squadrons. The visibility was so good that ten artillery emplacements were destroyed, 14 were damaged and seven ammunition pits exploded. Many of the remaining German artillery batteries were forced to stop firing because of the speed by which they were seen by the British air crews and engaged with counter-battery fire, the British having decided to suppress many batteries rather than destroy a few. Long-range bombing raids were successful and offensive patrols to protect the corps squadrons over the battlefield shot down two German aircraft and drove down 13 more.

== Aftermath ==
=== Analysis ===
In 1938, Wilfrid Miles, the British official historian, wrote that the attacks of the Battle of Thiepval Ridge had not completed its capture. The British had fought with skill and determination but the ridge was a defensive position of great strength and the German defenders fought with equal persistence. Both sides continued until they were exhausted, existing in trenches full of mud. More depended on the qualities of individuals in an operation that was not a form of semi-siege warfare. Destructive and creeping bombardments were used but the fighting took place on slopes full of trenches, shell-craters and dugouts, which made it difficult for artillery to fire in close support. Towards the end of the battle, co-ordinated broad front attacks might have had more success. After the loss of Stuff Trench beyond Stuff Redoubt, Erich Ludendorff the Erster Generalquartiermeister (First Quartermaster General), deputy to the Chief of the General Staff of OHL and Crown Prince Rupprecht, the army group commander for northern France, were willing to contemplate a retirement from the salient that had formed around St Pierre Division and Beaumont Hamel. Below considered that the remaining positions south of the Ancre were well fortified and on high ground, giving good observation and should be retained.

The capture of the redoubt was considered by some German officers to be a worse blow to morale than the fall of Thiepval. The 28th Reserve Division positions in the Ancre valley were exposed to British ground observation and made Grandcourt a death trap. The trenches were demolished and movement had to be from shell-hole to shell-hole; it was easy to get lost and blunder into British positions. Ludendorff and Rupprecht considered a retirement from the salient that had formed around St Pierre Division and Beaumont Hamel as the Germans had been pushed off the west end of Bazentin Ridge. Below objected because there were no better positions to retire to and preferred to counter-attack to regain Feste Staufen and the positions nearby. In 2005, Prior and Wilson wrote that the attack on the Mounds succeeded because of detailed preparation, the attacking units being fresh, despite the bad weather and resting battalions being used for digging and carrying. The artillery preparation was considered excellent and the assembly for the attack was so well covered by the bombardment, that the attack was a tactical surprise. The infantry were more experienced, keeping close to the creeping barrage and the German artillery-fire was judged to have been feeble. In 2009, William Philpott wrote that it had taken the Reserve Army/5th Army more than a month to capture the north end of the Thiepval Ridge against a reinvigorated German defence. The advance was costly and the front line had been moved barely 0.5 mi (0.80 km) forward.

=== Casualties ===
On 1 July, the 36th (Ulster) Division suffered 5,104 casualties. The 11th (Northern) Division from 10 to 30 September suffered 5,236 casualties and from 26 to 30 September were 3,615 casualties, 70 per cent of whom were wounded.

=== Subsequent operations ===
From 13 to 18 November the Reserve Army concluded the Battle of the Ancre Heights (1 October – 11 November) and fought the Battle of the Ancre (13–18 November), being renamed the Fifth Army on 30 October. The defences Below tried to retain were overrun and during the Battle of the Ancre, from 1 to 18 November, the 1st Army suffered 45,000 casualties including 7,183 prisoners.
