= Battle of the Ancre Heights =

WW1 battle in France

- Part of the Battle of the Somme of the First World War
- Battle of the Somme 1 July – 18 November 1916
Date	1 October – 11 November 1916
Location	Ancre, France 50.0664°N 2.7293°E
Result	British victory

Belligerents
British Empire: United Kingdom; Canada; France	German Empire

Commanders and leaders
Joseph Joffre; Douglas Haig; Ferdinand Foch; Hubert Gough	Erich Ludendorff; Kronprinz Rupprecht; Max von Gallwitz; Fritz von Below

Units involved
Reserve Army/Fifth Army	1st Army

Strength
6 divisions	

The Battle of the Ancre Heights (1 October – 11 November 1916), is the name given to the continuation of British attacks after the Battle of Thiepval Ridge from 26 to 28 September during the Battle of the Somme. The battle was conducted by the Reserve Army (renamed Fifth Army on 29 October) from Courcelette near the Albert–Bapaume road, west to Thiepval on Bazentin Ridge. (Note: After the end of the Battle of Flers–Courcelette on 22 September, the Anglo-French armies tried to press their advantage, with several smaller attacks in quick succession, rather than pause to regroup and give the German armies time to recover. Subsequent periodization has given discrete dates for the Anglo-French battles but there were considerable overlaps and continuity of operations, until the weather and supply difficulties in mid-November ended the battle until the new-year.) British possession of the heights would deprive the German 1st Army of observation towards Albert to the south-west and give the British observation north over the Ancre valley to the German positions around Beaumont-Hamel, Serre and Beaucourt. The Reserve Army conducted large attacks on 1, 8, 21, 25 October and from 10 to 11 November.

Many smaller attacks were made in the intervening periods, amid interruptions caused by frequent heavy rain, which turned the ground and roads into rivers of mud and grounded aircraft. German forces in footholds on the ridge, at the east end of Staufen Riegel (Regina Trench) and in the remaining parts of Schwaben-Feste (Schwaben Redoubt) to the north and Stuff Redoubt (Staufen-Feste) north-east of Thiepval, fought a costly defensive battle with numerous counter-attacks and attacks, which delayed the British capture of the heights for more than a month.

Stuff Redoubt fell on 9 October and the last German position in Schwaben Redoubt fell on 14 October, exposing the positions of the 28th Reserve Division in the Ancre valley to British ground observation. A German retreat from the salient that had formed around St. Pierre Divion and Beaumont Hamel either side of the Ancre, was considered by Generalquartiermeister Erich Ludendorff and the new army group commander Field Marshal Rupprecht, Crown Prince of Bavaria and rejected, due to the lack of better defensive positions further back, in favour of counter-attacks desired by General Fritz von Below the 1st Army commander. General Max von Gallwitz the 2nd Army commander, noted in early October that so many of his units had been moved to the 1st Army north of the Somme, that he had only one fresh regiment in reserve.

The German counter-attacks were costly failures and by 21 October, the British had managed to advance 500 yd (460 m) and take all but the last German foothold in the eastern part of Staufen Riegel (Regina Trench). A French offensive during the Battle of Verdun on 24 October, forced the Germans to suspend the movement of troops to the Somme front. From 29 October – 9 November, British attacks were postponed due to more poor weather, before the capture of 1,000 yd (910 m) of the eastern end of Regina Trench by the 4th Canadian Division on 11 November. Fifth Army operations resumed in the Battle of the Ancre (13–18 November).

== Background ==
=== Strategic developments ===
At the end of September, the Anglo-French armies had crossed the Péronne–Bapaume road around Bouchavesnes, taken Morval, Lesbœufs and Gueudecourt in the centre and captured most of Thiepval Ridge on the northern flank. On 29 September, Sir Douglas Haig instructed the Fourth Army to plan operations to advance towards Bapaume, reaching Le Transloy on the right and Loupart Wood north of the Albert–Bapaume road on the left. The Reserve Army was to extend the attacks of the Fourth Army by making converging attacks on the Ancre valley, attacking northwards from Thiepval Ridge towards Loupart Wood–Irles–Miraumont and eastwards on the north bank of the Ancre, by attacking towards Puisieux on a front from Beaumont Hamel to Hébuterne, with the right flank meeting the attacks from the south at Miraumont, to envelop German troops in the upper Ancre valley. The Third Army was to provide a flank guard north of the Reserve Army, by occupying a spur south of Gommecourt. The Reserve Army operations were to begin by 12 October, after the Fourth Army had attacked towards Le Transloy and Beaulencourt and the French Sixth Army had attacked Sailly-Saillisel around 7 October. The French Tenth Army south of the Somme was to attack on 10 October north of Chaulnes. Normal autumn weather in the Somme region would be an obstacle but an exceptional amount of rain and mist grounded aircraft and created vast mud fields, which caused many attacks to be postponed. Haig issued a much less ambitious directive on 7 October but the poor weather, German tactical changes and reinforcements on the Somme front, led to the costly failure of many attacks by both sides.

After meeting with Rawlinson and Gough, Haig cancelled the Third Army operation on 17 October. The Reserve Army plan for a converging attack towards the Ancre, was limited to an attack up the valley on 23 October. The failure of the Fourth Army attack of 18 October caused another revision of the plan, with II Corps of the Reserve Army to capture the rest of Thiepval Ridge on 19 October, the Fourth and French Sixth armies to attack on 23 October and the less ambitious Reserve Army attack to begin on 25 October. Gough issued a new operation order on 15 October and began another reorganization on the north side of the Ancre. There was more heavy rain on 19 October, which led a delay of the II Corps operation until 21 October. The attack succeeded but the rains returned on 24 October and the main attack next day was postponed. Gough was given discretion by Haig to make further postponements, on 27 October Gough set 1 November as the provisional date, postponed it again on 29 October to 5 November and on 3 November Haig gave Gough the choice of cancelling the attack; Haig also suggested a subsidiary attack while waiting for the weather to improve, if the state of the ground justified the effort. Gough proposed an attack on 9 November but preferred to wait for better weather. Haig agreed that no attack should begin until the ground was dry enough for infantry to move freely, when there was a forecast of two days of fair weather and another postponement followed.

In August the German armies on the Somme had been subjected to great strain. IX Reserve Corps had been "shattered" in the defence of Pozières, the 18th Reserve Division having lost 8,288 casualties. Ten fresh divisions had been brought into the Somme front and an extra division had been put into the line opposite the British. Movement behind the German front was made difficult by constant Anglo-French artillery-fire, which added to equipment shortages by delaying rail deliveries and interrupting road maintenance. Damage, wear, defective ammunition, capture and destruction had left 1,068 of 1,208 field guns and 371 of 820 heavy guns in the two German armies out of action by the end of August. The artillery situation was only slowly improved by the plan devised by Gallwitz to centralize counter-battery fire and use the reinforcements of aircraft to observe artillery fire. The extra aircraft had little effect on Allied air superiority but were able eventually to increase the accuracy and efficiency of bombardments.

The 2nd Army had been starved of reinforcements in mid-August to replace exhausted divisions in the 1st Army and plans for a counter-stroke had been abandoned for lack of troops. The emergency in Russia caused by the Brusilov Offensive, the entry of Rumania into the war and French counter-attacks at Verdun put further strain on the German army. Falkenhayn was sacked from the supreme command (Oberste Heeresleitung) on 28 August and replaced by Hindenburg and Ludendorff. The new supreme command (Third OHL) ordered an end to attacks at Verdun and the despatch of troops from the area to Rumania and the Somme front. On 5 September, proposals for a new shorter line to be built in France were ordered from the commanders of the western armies, who met Hindenburg and Ludendorff at Cambrai on 8 September, where they announced that no reserves were available for offensive operations except those planned for Rumania. Ludendorff condemned the policy of holding ground regardless of its tactical value and advocated holding front-line positions with the minimum of troops and the recapture of lost positions by counter-attacks.

On 15 September, Rupprecht was ordered to prepare a rear defensive line and on 23 September work on the new Siegfriedstellung (Hindenburg Position) was ordered to begin. On 21 September, after the battle of Flers–Courcelette (15–22 September), Hindenburg ordered that the Somme front was to have priority in the west for troops and supplies and by the end of the Battle of Morval (25–28 September), Rupprecht had no reserves left on the Somme front. During September, the Germans had sent another thirteen fresh divisions to the British sector and scraped up troops wherever they could be found. The German artillery had fired 213 train-loads of field artillery shells and 217 train-loads of heavy artillery ammunition, yet the début of the tank, the defeat at Thiepval (26–28 September) and the 130,000 casualties suffered by the armies on the Somme in September, had been severe blows to German morale. On 7 October, Rupprecht forecast a British attack north of the Ancre River in mid-October. Anxieties about the situation at Verdun also increased and on 19 October, the despatch of reinforcements from Verdun to the Somme was suspended. Defeats inflicted by the French Tenth Army (10–21 October) led to the sacking of the 2nd Army Chief of Staff, Bronsart von Schellendorf.

== Prelude ==
=== British preparations ===
The front-line of the Reserve Army had not moved far since the beginning of the battle, except in the south, near the Albert–Bapaume road; the ground behind the front-line was far less damaged than that behind the Fourth Army. When supply routes to the Fourth Army were washed out by rain in October, movement remained relatively easy in much of the Reserve Army area. Gough began to concentrate more troops north of the Ancre, for the attack intended for 12 October. In early October the north bank had been held by the 39th Division of V Corps, up to the boundary with the Third Army at Hébuterne. On 1 October the 2nd Division was moved in on the left of the 39th Division, to hold the ground from Redan Ridge to the army boundary. On 4 October the XIII Corps headquarters was brought out of reserve, to control 1,500 yd (1,400 m) of the front line, up to the junction with the Third Army and the left flank of the 2nd Division was relieved by the 51st Division. The 39th Division was transferred to II Corps on 2 October and then took over the area immediately south of the Ancre on 5 October, by extending its right flank to relieve the 18th Division at Thiepval.

By 7 October, XIII Corps had the 51st and 19th Divisions in line and on 8 October, V Corps relieved the 2nd Division with the 3rd and 63rd divisions. Gough issued instructions for the attack on the north bank from 4–12 October and arranged for the 1st Cavalry Division and the 3rd Cavalry Division to move closer to the front line. The artillery of V Corps and XIII Corps steadily bombarded the German defences on the south bank, where II Corps operations against Staufen Riegel (Regina Trench to the Canadians and Stuff Trench to the British) continued and simulated an offensive on the north bank with artillery bombardments, wire-cutting and smoke screens. Patrols and raids were carried out on the north bank, although mud and thick fog made it hard to keep direction. On 31 October, a patrol got into the German front-line near Hébuterne and found no Germans within 50 yd (46 m). On the night of 2 November, two V Corps patrols reached the German second line near Serre and a raid by the 31st Division of XIII Corps on 7 November, took four prisoners.

The 1st Cavalry Division, twelve batteries of siege artillery and three divisional artilleries from the Third Army was transferred to the Reserve Army and all 52 tanks in France were brought to Acheux. The constant postponements of the offensive gave tank commanders time to study the ground but the deterioration of the surface made tank operations unlikely. Tunnelling began in October between Beaumont-Hamel and Serre, to repair Russian saps (shallow trenches dug as tunnels, whose surfaces could be broken through, by crouching soldiers standing up) and to plant a mine at Hawthorn Ridge, under the crater made by the mine blown on 1 July. In the II Corps area south of the Ancre, the 25th Division had observation on its eastern flank over the Ancre valley around Grandcourt but the Germans had held on to the crest, from the northern face of Stuff Redoubt (Staufen-Feste) to the west end of the ridge. Preparations began for the capture of the rest of the redoubt and the higher ground just beyond, to gain observation over the rest of the Ancre valley. Assembly areas were prepared in Wood Post on the Authuille road and Blighty Valley and new communication trenches and deep dug-outs were built, before wet weather forced a postponement of the attack.

=== British plan ===
Weather 1 October – 11 November 1916
Date	Rain (mm)	°F	
1	0	63–41	fine dull
2	3	57–45	wet mist
3	0.1	70–50	rain mist
4	4	66–52	dull wet
5	6	66–54	dull rain
6	2	70–57	sun rain
7	0.1	66–52	wind rain
8	0.1	64–54	rain
9	0	64–50	fine
10	0	68–46	fine sun
11	0.1	66–50	dull
12	0	61–55	dull
13	0	61–50	dull
14	0	61–50	dull
15	3	57–41	rain
16	0.1	54–36	sun cold
17	3	55–43	fine
18	4	57–48	rain
19	4	57–37	rain
20	0	48–28	fine cold
21	0	45–28	fine cold
22	0	– –	fine cold
23	3	55–43	dull
24	3	54–45	dull rain
25	2	52–45	rain
26	1	55–39	rain
27	1	55–43	rain cold
28	8	55–41	wet cold
29	7	53–45	wet
30	7	61–48	wet cold
31	0	63–46	—
1	3	59–46	—
2	3	59–48	—
3	1	59–48	—
4	2	64–52	wet dull
5	0	59–48	fine
6	0	57–45	dull
7	12	55–45	—
8	2	57–43	—
9	0	54–30	fine
10	0	50–30	—
11	0.1	55–32	mist cold

Operations north of the Ancre waited on the completion of the capture of the ridge north of Courcelette and Thiepval, by the Canadian Corps and II Corps. The remainder of Stuff and Schwaben redoubts were to be captured and the front line was to be advanced to Regina Trench/Stuff Trench (Staufen Riegel) on the reverse slope of the ridge, the attack being set for 1 October. On 5 October Gough issued a Memorandum on Attacks which summarized the lessons of the battle. Gough pointed out that maintaining the momentum of an attack required succeeding waves and reserves not be kept waiting for opportunities to intervene in the battle, because communication delays left them with no time to act. Brigadiers should reorganize the troops holding successive objectives, since these troops became reserves once the advance had moved on.

Brigadiers should move with the advance and divisional commanders should create reserves by reorganizing their brigades. Headquarters should be placed where attacks could be seen, to keep in touch with events when communications broke down, a chronic problem which was increased by distance from the front line. Telephone links in the rear were far easier to maintain but became less important once the infantry battle began. Corps headquarters also had the benefit of air observation and less need of direct communication with troops on the battlefield, since their main role was counter-battery artillery-fire, which was independent of the infantry battle. The attack was to be maintained by the use of reserves moving towards objectives laid down before the attack, so as to make them independent of messages from the front line, which were often delayed and out of date if they arrived.

=== German preparations ===
In the first fortnight of October, the six German divisions from Le Transloy to the Ancre were replaced by seven divisions, two of which were quickly relieved in turn. By 20 October, the changes ordered by the new supreme command had begun to take effect. On the Somme front, 23 extra heavy batteries arrived for the 1st Army and 13.5 for the 2nd Army and 36 worn-out batteries were replaced. Systematic relief of tired divisions could be attempted, aircraft reinforcements were used to increase the amount of air observation for counter-battery fire, even more ammunition being fired in October than in September, which improved German infantry morale and slowed the advance of the Franco-British armies. Some of the changes were delayed in effect because of the French offensive at Verdun 24 October, which led to the suspension of transfers of troops to the Somme.

The relief of divisions opposite the British was achieved between 24 October and 10 November, by using more divisions from the 6th and 4th armies. After the British capture of Regina/Stuff Trench of 21 October, an evacuation of the salient from St Pierre Divion to Beaumont Hamel was proposed by Rupprecht but not implemented, because of objections by Below that the high ground still held gave valuable observation, which would be lost and that the remaining defences were strong and well-placed. The German troops north of the Ancre were reinforced, despite a suggestion from Loßberg the 1st Army Chief of Staff, to withdraw to the east of Lesbœufs. An attack was not expected east of Grandcourt on the south side of the river and the success of a 2nd Army counter-attack against the French Sixth Army at La Maisonnette on 29 October, increased German optimism that the battle of the Somme was almost over.

In late September, the Marine Infantry Brigade, which had an infantry strength equivalent to an army division and was composed of well trained and rested troops of excellent quality, was moved from the Belgian coast. On 30 September, the brigade relieved the 8th Division on the Ancre Heights in Staufen Riegel (Stuff/Regina Trench), south of Grandcourt and Miraumont. Staufen Riegel had been dug as a supply route to Staufen-Feste (Stuff Redoubt) and was on the reverse slope, which proved a considerable advantage against an attack from the south. Reserves could be sheltered nearby at Baum Mulde (Boom Ravine), which was difficult for British artillery to bombard from the south because of the obstruction of the ridge. In the long periods of poor visibility, artillery observation aircraft were grounded, which made British bombardments even more inaccurate but the Marine Brigade still had a stream of casualties caused by shellfire. Nightly supply deliveries and frequent relief enabled the Marines to hold their positions.

== Battle ==
=== Reserve/Fifth Army ===
==== 1–7 October ====
On 1 October the 2nd Canadian Division attacked Regina Trench with two brigades at 3:15 p.m. either side of the Courcelette–Miraumont road, despite many British shells falling short onto their jumping-off line. On the extreme right, the 4th Canadian Brigade dug in 400 yd (370 m) forward and connected on the right with the 23rd Division north of Destremont Farm. Three 5th Canadian Brigade battalions attacked on a 1,200 yd (1,100 m) front west of the road and the right hand battalion was caught by artillery and machine-gun fire, halfway to Regina Trench. Hardly any troops reached the objective, where the wire was found to be uncut and the Canadian parties were forced to retreat. The centre battalion reached Kenora Trench but was not able to advance towards Regina Trench beyond, due to German machine-gun fire. The left battalion advanced at first, until the 3rd Canadian Division battalion of the 8th Canadian Brigade to its left was driven back by a German counter-attack, German bombers making their way down Regina Trench. By nightfall, the 5th Canadian Brigade held most of Kenora Trench, with outposts in the western of the two Courcelette–Miraumont roads and Courcelette Trench running north parallel to the eastern Courcelette–Miraumont road, before being relieved by the 6th Brigade before dawn.

On the left, a brigade of the 3rd Canadian Division was stopped by German artillery, uncut wire and machine-gun fire short of Regina Trench, where it conducted a bombing fight, before withdrawing at 2:00 a.m.; a resumption of the attack was delayed by bad weather until 8 October. In the II Corps area west of the Canadian Corps, the 25th Division relieved the 11th Division on 1 October and began consolidation of the new front line in rain and mud, while waiting for an improvement in the weather to attack the rest of Stuff Redoubt. A brigade of the 18th Division continued the fight for Schwaben Redoubt on 2 October, when the Germans began a big counter-attack at 5:15 a.m., from the east end of the redoubt to the old front line south of St. Pierre Divion. After fighting all day, the Germans gained a small amount of ground. At 10:00 a.m. next morning, a British battalion attempted to bomb their way into Schwaben Redoubt from two directions but bogged in deep mud. The 18th Division was relieved by the 39th Division on 7 October, which was then attacked in the British part of Schwaben Redoubt by German troops and a flame thrower detachment, which was repulsed by two battalions of 117th Brigade. The Canadians connected their advanced posts along a line about 300 yd (270 m) from Regina Trench and began to send scouting parties forward each day, who reported that as the wire in front of the trench was being cut, the Germans put out "concertina" wire to fill the gaps.

==== 8 October ====
The 1st Canadian Division attacked on 8 October at 4:50 a.m. in cold rain. The 1st Brigade on the right with two battalions took the front trench of the Le Sars line from Dyke Road to 400 yd (370 m) beyond the Quadrilateral and repulsed a counter-attack with artillery-fire. As the Canadians reorganized before resuming the attack on the Quadrilateral, a heavy German bombardment fell in the area and a counter-attack began from two directions. After hours of costly fighting the Canadians withdrew to their jumping-off trenches, when they ran out of bombs having had 770 casualties out of 1,100 men and taken 240 prisoners. After night fell a trench was dug on the right to link with the 23rd Division. The right-hand battalion of the 3rd Brigade was delayed by uncut wire but forced its way through and took part of Regina Trench on its right flank. The left-hand battalion was stopped in front of the trench with many casualties and the brigade withdrew at nightfall. A few troops of the right-flank battalion of the 9th Brigade of the 3rd Canadian Division got into Regina Trench through some German sally ports but were overwhelmed. The left-hand battalion had reached Regina Trench, where it joined Courcelette Trench and been forced back by the defenders. Part of the 7th Brigade reached Regina Trench and began to bomb westwards and also worked its way up West Miraumont Road but was eventually forced back by German counter-attacks. The left hand battalion was obstructed by new German barbed wire covered by machine-guns and was not able to advance up Kenora Trench. Relief of the Canadian Corps began on 10 October.

==== 9–20 October ====
In an operation by II Corps on 9 October, a battalion of the 39th Division attempted a surprise attack on the northern face of Schwaben Redoubt at 4:30 a.m. but the German defenders were ready for them. Only on the right flank, did British troops reached the trench but were then forced out by a German counter-attack. At 12:35 p.m. a battalion of the 25th Division attacked Stuff Redoubt, with the support of an "intense" barrage and by 12:42 p.m. captured the objective and pushed advanced posts forward to the north-east, although the high ground to the north could not be captured. Two counter-attacks in the evening were defeated by artillery and machine-gun fire. The 7th Brigade of the 25th Division began to prepare another attack on 10 October to take "The Mounds" not captured the day before. Next day, German counter-attacks were made at Stuff Redoubt against the 25th Division and continued on 12 October, including two supported by a flame-thrower detachment, which were repulsed. 13 October was quiet and on 14 October the 25th Division attacked "The Mounds", with the 7th Brigade. Six minutes before the attack began at 2:46 p.m., a German barrage began on the British line but the attackers advanced 200 yd (180 m) to the objective behind a dense creeping barrage.

Prisoners later said that the assembly for the attack had been seen but that the officer in command had ordered the German artillery to cease-fire just as the British attack began. Possession of The Mounds gave observation over Grandcourt and observation posts were pushed forward over the ridge. Work began on the extension of communication trenches soon after the attack, to be ready for another advance planned for 19 October. The 39th Division attacked Schwaben Redoubt at 2:45 p.m. with two battalions of the 118th Brigade and one from the 117th Brigade in support and captured the remaining German positions in the redoubt, in fighting which went on until 11:00 p.m., as a third 118th Brigade battalion pushed forward on the left. Next day the Germans counter-attacked the redoubt three times, two of the attacks using flame-throwers. On 16 October the 116th Brigade moved from the north bank of the Ancre and took over the redoubt, which was shelled all through 17 October. An attack by II Corps intended for 19 October was postponed because of heavy rain.

==== 21 October ====
On 21 October a German attack at 5:00 a.m. occupied parts of Schwaben Redoubt, before being forced out by bombing attacks from two battalions of the 39th Division. The British attack delayed from 19 October began with the 4th Canadian Division on the right and the 18th, 25th and 39th divisions in line to the left, on a 5,000 yd (2.8 mi; 4.6 km) front. The fire of 200 heavy guns and howitzers and the field artilleries of seven divisions were found to have severely damaged Stuff/Regina Trench and cut most of the wire. The 4th Canadian Division attacked Regina Trench (the east end of Staufen Riegel) at 12:06 p.m. with the 11th Brigade, supported by an overhead machine-gun barrage and took Regina Trench. East of the Courcelette–Pys road a defensive flank was formed, with outposts pushed forward from Regina Trench and the left-hand battalion linked with troops from the 18th Division. Three German counter-attacks were defeated during the afternoon. Two battalions from the 53rd Brigade of the 18th Division attacked and reached their objectives in Stuff Trench despite a delay at the Courcelette–Grandcourt road, where troops from the 25th Division joined in a bombing fight against a Landwehr unit. As the objective was being consolidated, twelve Germans arrived unaware that Staufen Riegel had been occupied and were taken prisoner.

The 25th Division attacked with three battalions of the 74th Brigade on the right and with three battalions and an attached company of the 75th Brigade on the left. Standing artillery barrages were placed on all known German trenches, strongpoints and machine-gun nests and the creeping barrage was fired by three divisional artilleries. The advance began at 12:06 p.m. in three waves and reached Stuff Trench (Staufen Riegel) where the German defenders inflicted many casualties on the 74th Brigade, before being overwhelmed. Some of the attackers advanced too far and the 75th Brigade on the left reached Stuff Trench with no troops on their right. At 1:25 p.m. a contact aircraft reported a gap of 300 yd (270 m) between the brigades, which was closed by bombing parties and the Stokes mortar battery of the 75th Brigade attacking eastwards. The attack had taken thirty minutes and the advance was stopped by the British protective barrage. At Stump Road a short bombing fight took place to capture German dugouts along the road, 731 prisoners, 19 machine-guns and three field guns being captured. Touch was gained with the neighbouring divisions by 4:00 p.m. and a communication trench was dug just after dark. Later in the day the 116th Brigade of the 39th Division attacked and captured Stuff Trench (Staufen Riegel) while troops from the 117th Brigade attacked Pope's Nose and gained some ground. Observation beyond the objective was found to be unsatisfactory because of the convex slope.

==== 22 October – 11 November ====
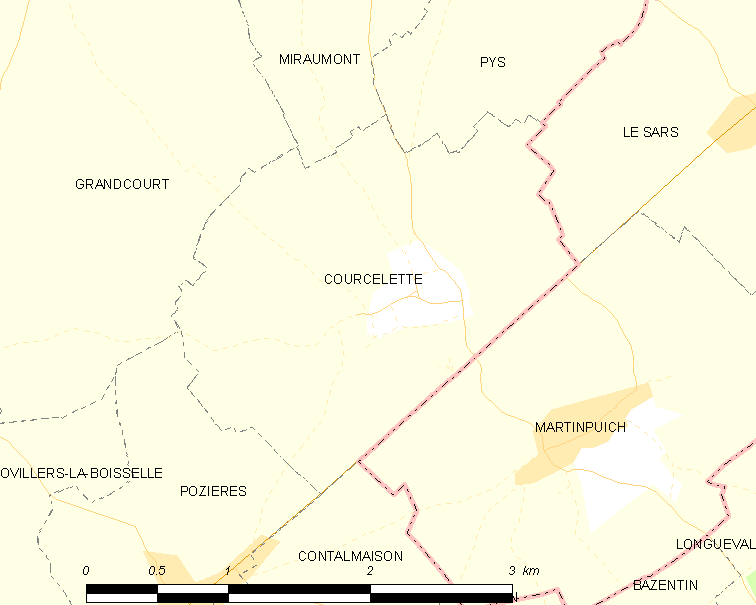
Modern map of the area of Regina Trench, west of Courcelette (commune FR insee code 80216)

During the night of 22 October, the 19th Division relieved the 25th Division and part of the 39th Division sector and the 18th Division moved its left boundary to the Pozières–Miraumont road. Prisoners were still being found and by the end of the day 1,057 had been taken. Next day, a battalion of the 4th Canadian Division tried to advance along Regina Trench towards Farmer Road but they were stopped by flanking machine-gun fire and a German artillery bombardment. On 26 October, the 19th Division drove off a German attack on Stuff Redoubt at 5:00 a.m.. On 28 October the Special Brigade R. E. fired 1,126 "SK" (lacrymatory) 4-inch Stokes mortar bombs into Beaumont Hamel, 135 40 lb (18 kg) phosgene bombs into the village and Y Ravine nearby and thirty 2-inch White Star (50 percent chlorine: 50 percent phosgene) mortar bombs into Serre.

Vigorous raiding and patrolling began on the north bank of the Ancre. On 29 October the 39th Division took more ground at Pope's Nose, before bad weather stopped operations in II Corps on the south bank, until the night of 10/11 November. A patrol from troops of XIII Corps on the north bank entered the German front-line near Hébuterne on 31 October and found it empty and a raid by the 30th Division killed 30 Germans on 7 November. Mud prevented movement on 9 and 10 November and in II Corps another gas bombardment on Beaumont Hamel took place on 11 November. 180 lachrymatory bombs were fired from 4-inch Stokes mortars at 5:00 a.m. and at 3:0 p.m. 47 gas drums were fired into the village and 37 more fired at Y Ravine. At midnight two 10th Brigade battalions and a company from an 11th Brigade battalion of the 4th Canadian Division, attacked the east end of Regina Trench and established advanced posts to the north-east, close to the German positions of the Le Sars–Pys line, before defeating several counter-attacks. The Battle of the Ancre began on 13 November with more attacks by II Corps on the south bank, combined with attacks from V Corps and XIII Corps on the north bank.

=== Air operations ===
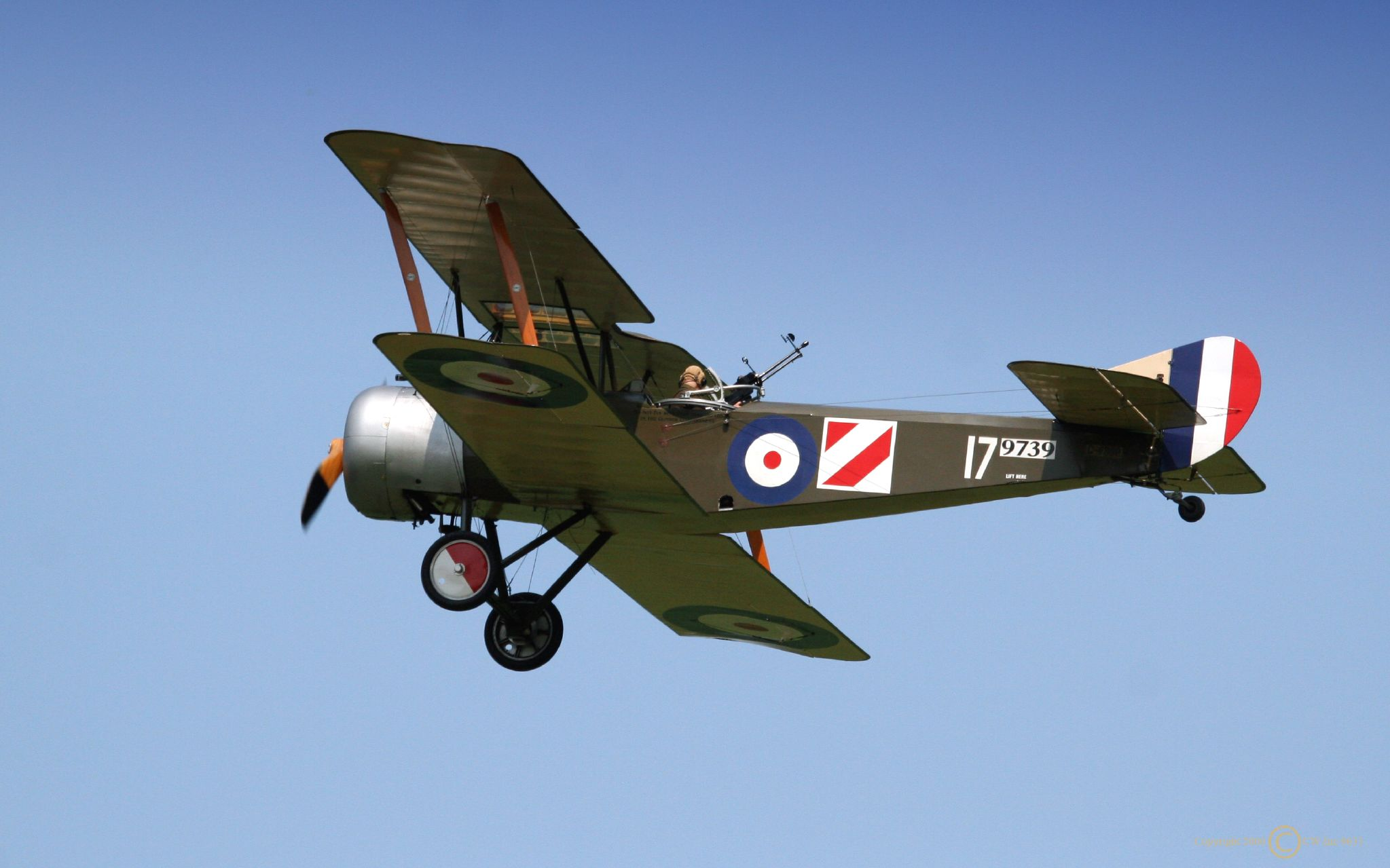
Sopwith 1½ Strutter

In October the Germans concentrated more than 300 aircraft on the Somme front, including the new Albatros D.II and Albatros D.III, which were superior to the best British and French machines. The deployment of two of the new Jagdstaffeln (fighter wings), challenged the air superiority of the Anglo-French air services. On 5 October a dogfight of over 50 aircraft north of Bapaume was watched by German troops until the British aircraft withdrew. The troops who had spent periods on the Somme front earlier in the battle, were much encouraged by the sight of German aircraft challenging Allied aircraft, which continued during the infrequent periods of good flying weather in October. British reinforcements also reached the Somme front between August and October, three being new squadrons from England and five from the Royal Flying Corps (RFC) brigades further north, being replaced by four more new squadrons from England. The two squadrons of obsolete Royal Aircraft Factory B.E.12s were withdrawn from fighter operations and many squadrons on the Somme were tired and understrength.

Pressure was put on the Admiralty to send Royal Naval Air Service (RNAS) aircraft down from Dunkirk and Naval Squadron No. 8 (Naval 8) arrived at Vert Galand on 26 October. In the morning of 1 October two III Brigade squadrons attacked the railway station at Miraumont with 112 lb (51 kg) bombs, which caused fires to burn all afternoon and aircraft from 19 Squadron attacked German billets at Havrincourt. During the Canadian attack that afternoon, British artillery observation aircraft sent 67 zone calls to the artillery to fire on German artillery batteries and 39 were sent by balloon observers. (Note: "Zones" were based on lettered squares of the army 1:40,000 map; each map square was divided into four sections 3,000 yd (1.7 mi; 2.7 km) square. The observer used a call sign of the map square letter then the zone letter to signal to the artillery. All guns and howitzers up to 6 in (150 mm) able to bear on the target opened rapid fire, using corrections of aim from the air observer.) Rain fell all next day, grounding British aircraft; a formation of German aircraft surprised the British by appearing over the front-line, where one was shot down by anti-aircraft fire. Very little air activity took place until 10 October when the rain abated. Aircraft from both sides flew many sorties and several British aircraft were shot down, all by Jasta 2 (Boelcke). An offensive patrol attacked seven German aircraft over Vélu and drove them off, despite the superior speed and manoeuvrability of the German aircraft, one aircraft from each side being shot down, along with three more from each side lost near Morval and Pozierès. British aircraft attacked Douai aerodrome and the railway stations at Cambrai, Marcoing and Vitry overnight.

More bad weather restricted flying until 16 October, when British and German bombers began operations before dawn. Cambrai was bombed again and the Germans attacked the aerodrome of 9 Squadron, wounding two ground crew, destroying one aircraft and damaging another. In the afternoon the British attacked Havrincourt, the station and aerodrome at Hermies and then Ruyaulcourt, two British aircraft being shot down. British corps aircraft were frequently attacked by German fighters, one being shot down and another damaged and four German and one British aircraft were shot down, in fights with British offensive patrols. (Note: From 30 January 1916, each British army had a Royal Flying Corps brigade attached, which was divided into wings, the "corps wing" with squadrons responsible for close reconnaissance, photography and artillery observation on the front of each army corps and an "army wing" which by 1917 conducted long-range reconnaissance and bombing, using aircraft types with the highest performance.) The better weather continued on 17 October and a supply dump was blown up at Bapaume station. A reconnaissance by Third Army aircraft at the north end of the Somme front, met twenty German fighters and two aircraft were shot down by each side. A British aircraft was driven down by German fighters and two German aircraft were forced down by 24 Squadron near Vélu; rain and sleet then stopped flying for two days.

On 20 October, aircraft of 11 Squadron on photographic reconnaissance near Douai, were attacked by Jasta 2, which shot down two aircraft and damaged two more. Nine aircraft of 27 Squadron made a long-range attack on Aulnoye junction near Maubeuge, for no loss and 70 Squadron aircraft which photographed Valenciennes and Le Quesnoy returned. Thirty-three German aircraft crossed the British front line and made many attacks on British aircraft; three German aircraft were shot down and seventeen claimed damaged. German night bombers attacked Querrieu, Corbie and Longueau, where an ammunition waggon was blown up; British aircraft attacked Vélu and Péronne. After the German morning attack on Schwabenfeste (Schwaben Redoubt) on 21 October, the British attack planned for the afternoon followed up the German repulse, with the assistance of contact patrols from two squadrons, which in good visibility directed artillery-fire and destroyed ten gun-pits, damaged fourteen and blew up seven ammunition pits. Zone calls from British aircraft silenced many German guns, including nine German batteries firing on the Canadian troops attacking Regina Trench. Long-range bombers attacked an ammunition dump at Ath (near Mons) which had been reported by a French spy. An aircraft bombed from 300 ft (91 m) and set fire to the dump, before the formation returned safely. Quéant station was bombed by thirty more aircraft and escorts, which were intercepted over the target and one bomber shot down. An escort pilot flying a Nieuport 17 turned back, after the bombers reached British lines but was then forced down in a dogfight with a faster German aircraft. On other parts of the Somme front two German aircraft were shot down, three damaged and ten driven down.

On 22 October there were many sorties by German flyers. Six aircraft attacked a Sopwith 1½ Strutter of 45 Squadron and wounded the observer, who shot one down. Later in the day, three 45 Squadron aircraft were shot down and an F.E.2b shot down one aircraft and damaged another, before the observer was mortally wounded; four British aircraft were shot down beyond German lines. During 23 October two Reserve Army artillery observation aeroplanes were shot down by Jasta 2. On 26 October, despite poor weather both sides flew many sorties; a fight between five Airco DH.2's of 24 Squadron and twenty Halberstadt D.II's was indecisive but later in the day a formation of eight aircraft led by Boelcke, shot down one British observation aircraft, forced down two more and a British fighter which intervened. One German fighter was then shot down when a formation of British fighters from 32 Squadron turned up. Boelcke was killed on 28 October, when he collided with a German aircraft during an attack on two British fighters, which returned safely. For the rest of the battle of the Somme, both sides flew in rain, mist, sleet and westerly gales, often at dangerously low heights, to direct artillery and attack troops with guns and bombs.

3 November was a clear day and German aircraft shot down five British aircraft. On the night of 6 November German night bombers hit an ammunition train near Cerisy, which exploded next to a cage for German prisoners of war and devastated the area. Better weather came on 8 November and many German aircraft made ground attacks on British troops, a tactic which the Luftstreitkräfte began to incorporate systematically into its defensive operations. The British attempted to divert German attention next day, with bombing raids on Arleux and Vraucourt. The raid on Vraucourt by twelve bombers and fourteen escorts became the biggest air fight of the war, when approximately thirty German aircraft attacked the formation as it crossed the front lines. Most of the bombs were dropped over the target but six British aircraft were shot down and three German aircraft were claimed. Three more British aircraft were shot down later in the day; one pilot was killed, one wounded and an observer were wounded in aircraft which returned. The railway station at Vitry and German airfields at Buissy, Vélu and Villers were attacked after dark, while German night bombers attacked the airfield at Lavieville.

The British attacked Valenciennes aerodrome next morning, where five parked aircraft, hangars and sheds were bombed. (Note: During periods of fine weather in October, British reconnaissance flights had reported new defences being built far behind the Somme front; on 9 November a formation of eight photographic reconnaissance aircraft and eight escorts reported a new line of defences, from Bourlon Wood–Quéant–Bullecourt–Sensée river–Héninel to the German third line near Arras. Two lines closer to the front were observed as they were dug, the R. I or Allaines Stellung from Ablainzevelle–west of Bapaume–Roquigny and R. II Stellung (Armin Stellung), a branch from Achiet-le-Grand to Beugny and Ytres.) Next day, German air operations were less extensive; three aircraft were shot down and three damaged for the loss of one British aeroplane. Naval 8 drove down two German aircraft on 10 November and overnight 18 Squadron retaliated for the attack on their airfield at Lavieville by bombing Valenciennes, Vélu, transport on the Bapaume road, balloon sheds, a train near St. Léger and a second train which was set on fire; a German headquarters at Havrincourt Château and Douai aerodrome were also attacked. German bombers attacked Amiens station and returned on the night of 10/11 November, when one aircraft was forced down with engine-trouble and the crew captured. On 11 November, operations began for the Battle of the Ancre, the last British attack of the Battle of the Somme, before the offensive was stopped for the winter.

=== German 1st Army ===
On 30 September the Marine Brigade moved up through Baum Mulde (Boom Ravine) and relieved the 8th Division on the right of the 4th Ersatz Division, in Staufen Riegel (Stuff/Regina Trench), which they found to have disappeared due to the effect of the British artillery bombardments. On 1 October, the British artillery bombardment increased in intensity to "drumfire", while the German artillery stayed silent because of a shortage of ammunition, being limited to firing only when the British infantry attack began. British aircraft flew overhead at 100 ft (30 m) observing for the artillery, strafing the ground when they saw movement and throwing hand-grenades. At about 4:00 p.m., the British artillery lifted towards Baum Mulde and Miraumont. The German defenders of the 8th Division saw waves of Canadian infantry advancing, while the division was being relieved by the Marine Brigade and fired rockets to alert the German artillery, which opened fire immediately. Numerous counter-attacks by battalions of the 1st and 2nd Marine Regiments eventually forced the Canadians to withdraw, before attempting to attack again by dribbling forward from shell-hole to shell-hole. The Canadian attacks ceased at nightfall, having been costly to both sides. On 2 October, parts of the 66th and 170th regiments of the 52nd Division, attached to the 26th Reserve Division, attacked at the east end of Schwaben-Feste (Schwaben Redoubt) and the German lines further east and gained a small amount of ground. On 7 October the 110th Reserve Regiment of the 28th Reserve Division, which was relieving the 26th Reserve Division, began attacks on Schwaben-Feste assisted by Flammenwerfer detachments, which continued on 8 October.

Another British attack on 7 October, captured parts of Staufen Riegel before the 2nd Marine Regiment and part of the 1st Marine Regiment repulsed the attack, with many casualties on both sides. Staufen-Feste fell on 9 October and counter-attacks by the 111th Reserve Regiment from 9–12 October were defeated. A British attempt at a surprise attack on Schwaben-Feste was repulsed and the last part of the Schwaben-Feste was lost on 14 October, which left the 28th Reserve Division positions in the Ancre valley, under British ground observation and the ground around St. Pierre Divion and Beaumont Hamel in a salient. A hasty counter-attack collapsed into chaos on the night of 14/15 October, despite the participation of stormtrooper (Sturmtruppen) and Flammenwerfer detachments. A company refused to attack for fear of being hit by German artillery and when a second attack was ordered another company refused to attack. On 21 October Staufen Riegel was lost except for the east end of the trench and the 5th Ersatz Division, which had relieved the Marine Brigade on 11/12 October was pushed back for 500 yd (460 m). By 22 October, the British had captured 1,057 prisoners from the 28th Reserve and 5th Ersatz divisions, which were relieved in turn by the 38th Division and the 58th Division, which counter-attacked Staufen-Feste and the lines to the east on 26 October. The attack failed with many casualties in the 107th Regiment of the 58th Division and the 2nd Guard Reserve Regiment of the 1st Guard Reserve Division further east. Divisions which had already fought on the Somme and were being sent for a second time, found that their fighting power had been seriously eroded.

=== French operations ===
The French Sixth Army operations to outflank Péronne from the north continued in October and the Fourth Army co-operated with the Sixth Army in the Battle of Le Transloy (1 October – 5 November). (Note: Military units after the first one mentioned in this paragraph are French unless specified.) Waterlogged ground of the Somme valley obstructed progress further south but XXXIII Corps, that operated on both sides of the Somme, attacked on the south bank on 18 October, to counter German mining and improve the line from La Maisonnette to Biaches, although a German counter-attack on 21 October regained some ground. On 29 October, the XXXIII Corps was pushed out of La Maisonnette, at the end of the salient south-east of Biaches. A French attempt to retake the village was delayed and eventually cancelled. The Tenth Army attacked from 10 to 21 October and captured woods near Chaulnes. The line was advanced towards Ablaincourt, Pressoir and Fresnes on a front from Chaulnes to 3.5 mi (5.6 km) to the north-east. More attacks by the Tenth Army were delayed by bad weather until 7 November, when Bois Kratz, Ablaincourt-Pressoir were captured; numerous German counter-attacks, including a big attack at Bois Kratz and Pressoir on 15 November were defeated; preparations were begun by the French to advance to a line from Mazancourt, to Happlincourt and Biaches, ready for a spring offensive.

== Aftermath ==
=== Analysis ===
British gas shell expenditure October 1916 (Note: SK: Ethyl iodoacetate 75 per cent and Ethanol 25 per cent.)
Calibre	Sub- total
4.5"; SK	4,144
4.5" lethal	3,898
4.7"; SK	60
4.7" lethal	505
60-pdr SK	1,744
60-pdr lethal	2,145
Total	12,496

The loss of Thiepval had been a huge blow to German morale but the loss of Staufen and Schwaben redoubts, was considered by some German officers to be worse. Rather than order a withdrawal from these exposed positions, Rupprecht and Ludendorff accepted Below's argument that there were no better positions to withdraw to and supported his attempt to recapture the redoubts, which only added to German losses. Reports made after the battle by units of the Canadian Corps, stressed that battalion command was impossible once an attack began, companies and platoons needed to be given objectives before the attack and discretion on how to reach them. The attacking troops should have 24 hours in the line to study the ground, followed by 24 hours in reserve to receive a detailed briefing. The equipment to be carried was discussed and it was suggested that the first wave should not carry tools but a light load of 120 rounds of ammunition, two hand grenades, two days' rations and a ground sheet. (Some units pointed out that most of the tools carried by the leading troops were thrown away anyway.) The importance of carrying enough hand grenades was stressed, since uncut wire forced the attackers into German communication trenches, where many more were used to fight forward, which used up the stock intended for repelling counter-attacks, compared to an advance on the surface.

Where barbed wire was cut, the infantry could move above ground, bypassing isolated German defences and leaving them for mopping-up parties. The value of Lewis guns and plenty of ammunition was emphasised in many reports, as was the importance of moving them forward quickly in an attack, to support the infantry and then be ready to engage German infantry counter-attacks. By the end of the battle of the Somme, each platoon had a Lewis gun, giving 16 per battalion. Opinion divided over the Stokes mortar because of its rate of fire, each bomb weighed about 11 lb (5.0 kg), which meant that it was impractical to carry many forward in an attack. The mortar was most useful in static positions at the rear, until supply routes had been built to the new front line. Tanks were judged to have serious limitations in mechanical reliability, mobility and armour protection but were considered a useful accessory to infantry operations, having overcome German strong points and diverted German artillery-fire from the infantry. It was found that tank-infantry co-ordination had been impossible, since tanks and infantry moved at different speeds but that when infantry led an attack, tanks could mop-up behind them and when tanks led, they could destroy German defences before the infantry arrived.

Tactics were considered and a new platoon organization was proposed by Major-General R. B. Stephens of the 5th Division, in which there would be four specialist sections, equipped with rifles, rifle-grenades, bombs and a Lewis gun. Advancing by flanking manoeuvres was favoured, to exploit the German defensive change from trench lines to strongpoints, after they had been forced out of their front-line defences on the Somme. Infantry could follow a creeping barrage to within 100 yd (91 m) of German defences, crawl another 50 yd (46 m) and then rush the Germans, before they could emerge from their shelters. It was recommended that infantry waves be equipped for different tasks, with the first wave comprising about half of the attacking force, carrying rifles, bombs and Lewis guns, the Lewis gunners and bombers moving beyond the objective to form advanced posts and the second wave carrying tools and trench stores for consolidation. Opinion about the allocation of objectives varied, with some reports favouring the first wave moving on from the first objective and others advocating that following waves leap-frog through the wave ahead, while that wave consolidated and recovered from the stress and exertion of the advance.

Details of infantry formation within lines and waves (groups of lines) was discussed, with dispersal advocated to present smaller targets to German machine-gunners and artillery and concentration emphasised, to keep troops close enough together to be able to overwhelm German defences. An attack on 1 October, with three waves of infantry standing 5 yd (4.6 m) apart, advancing 800 yd (730 m) against Regina Trench which turned out to be undamaged, was called suicidal. If infantry waves passed beyond initial objectives, the ground would need to be searched and garrisoned, to prevent German troops firing on them from behind. It was recommended that mopping-up parties should form 25 percent of the attacking force and be ready to act as local reinforcements, should the attack bog down. Some units wanted a third wave of attackers, who could prepare captured ground for defence without delay.

Regaining contact with field artillery after the attack was considered essential, so that German counter-attacks could be engaged with shrapnel fire, to obstruct German troops as they concentrated for attack and to create a barrier against the survivors. Advanced posts pushed beyond the objective gave early warning of German attacks and forced then under cover, outside grenade-throwing range; the advanced posts could also be connected later. Communication was essential, all reports stressed the efficiency of telephones and some units advocated dispensing with visual communication, since the smoke and dust of battle made them invisible. Runners were the second most reliable means of maintaining contact between advanced troops, battalion and brigade headquarters. The Canadian Corps decided to use telephones, runners, pigeons and visual signals, given the unpredictable characteristics of the battlefield. Aeroplanes on contact-patrol had been found to be ineffective and more training of the infantry in contact-patrol liaison was recommended.

=== Casualties ===
British, French and German casualties October–November 1916
Month	British	French	Total	German	(% of Allied total)
October	57,722	37,626	95,348	78,500	82.3
November	39,784	20,129	59,913	45,000	75.0

The 2nd Canadian Division suffered 6,530 casualties 1 September – 4 October. Casualties suffered by the 3rd Canadian Division 27 September – 14 October were 2,969. The 18th Division incurred 3,344 casualties 26 September – 5 October. Canadian Corps casualties on 8 October were 1,364. When the Canadian Corps was relieved, its casualties during the Battle of the Somme were 24,029, roughly 24 per cent of the forces involved. The Marine Brigade suffered 686 casualties in one regiment and up to 41 per cent of the other two until it was relieved by the 5th Ersatz Division on the night of 11/12 October.

=== Victoria Cross ===
James Richardson of the 16th Battalion (Canadian Scottish), 3rd Brigade, 1st Canadian Division was awarded a posthumous Victoria Cross for his actions on 8 October 1916.

== See also ==
- List of Canadian battles during World War I
