= Vecquemont =

- Commune
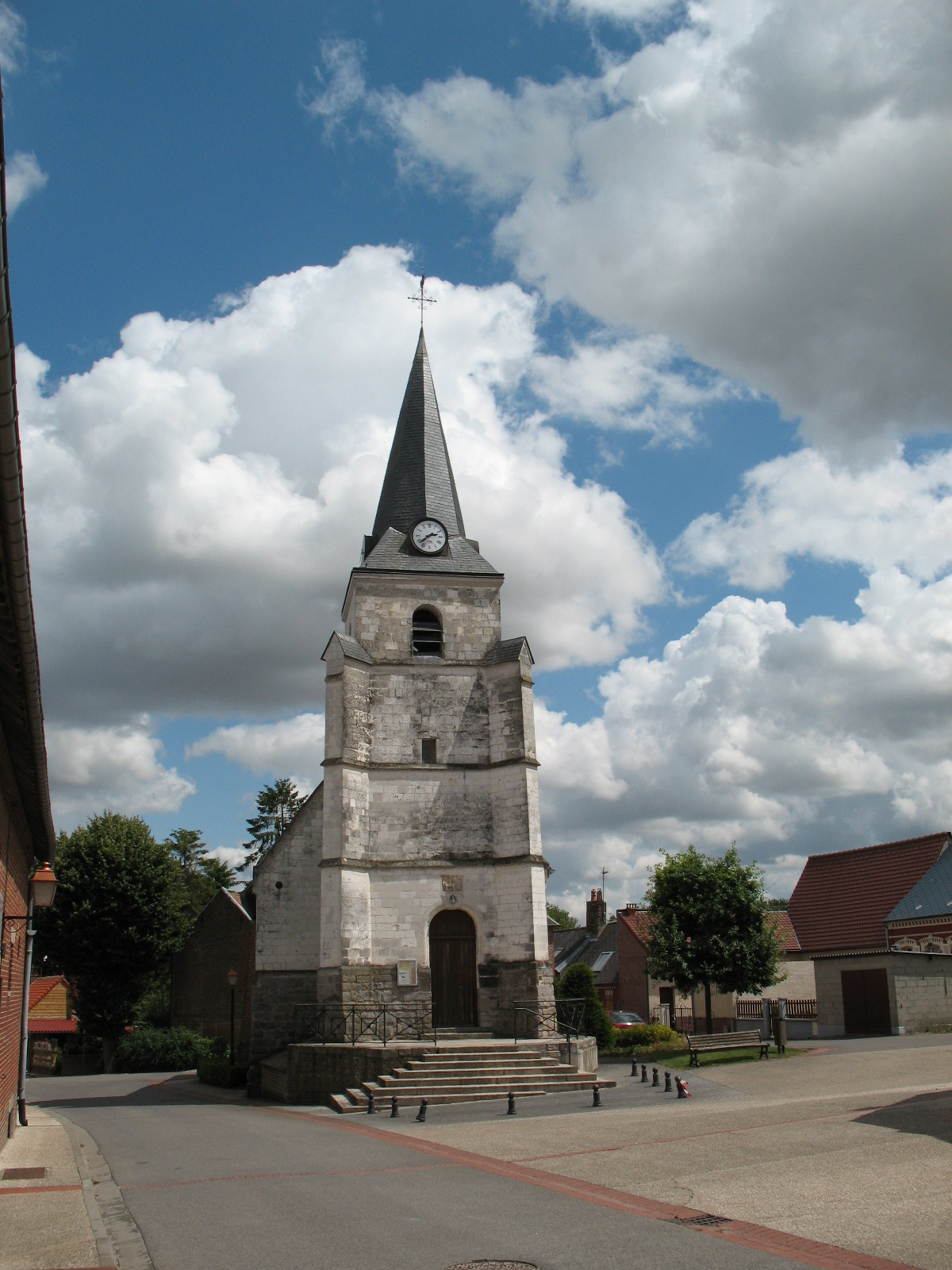
- The church in Vecquemont
- Location of Vecquemont
- Location within France Location within Hauts-de-France
- Coordinates: 49°53′57″N 2°27′07″E
- Country: France
- Region: Hauts-de-France
- Department: Somme
- Arrondissement: Amiens
- Canton: Amiens-3
- Intercommunality: Val de Somme

Government
  - Mayor (2020–2026): Jean-Louis Bruxelle
- Area^{1}: 1.87 km^{2} (0.72 sq mi)
- Elevation: 34 m (112 ft)
- Highest elevation: 50 m (160 ft)
- Lowest elevation: 22 m (72 ft)
- Population (2023): 531
  - Density: 284/km^{2} (735/sq mi)
- Time zone: UTC+01:00 (CET)
  - Summer (DST): UTC+02:00 (CEST)
- INSEE/Postal code: 80785 /80800
- ^{1} French Land Register data, which excludes lakes, ponds, glaciers > 1 km^{2} (0.386 sq mi or 247 acres) and river estuaries.

Vecquemont (French pronunciation: [vɛkmɔ̃]; Picard: Vècmont) is a commune in the Somme department in Hauts-de-France in northern France.

== Geography ==
Vecquemont is situated 7 miles (11 km) east of Amiens, on the D11a road and by the banks of the river Somme.

== Population ==
Historical population
Year	Pop.	±% p.a.
1968	287	—
1975	415	+5.41%
1982	485	+2.25%
1990	440	−1.21%
1999	497	+1.36%
2007	547	+1.21%
2012	547	+0.00%
2017	540	−0.26%
2023	531	−0.28%
Source: INSEE

== See also ==
- Communes of the Somme department
