= September 1916 =

Month in 1916

<<	September 1916					>>
Su	Mo	Tu	We	Th	Fr	Sa
					1	2
3	4	5	6	7	8	9
10	11	12	13	14	15	16
17	18	19	20	21	22	23
24	25	26	27	28	29	30

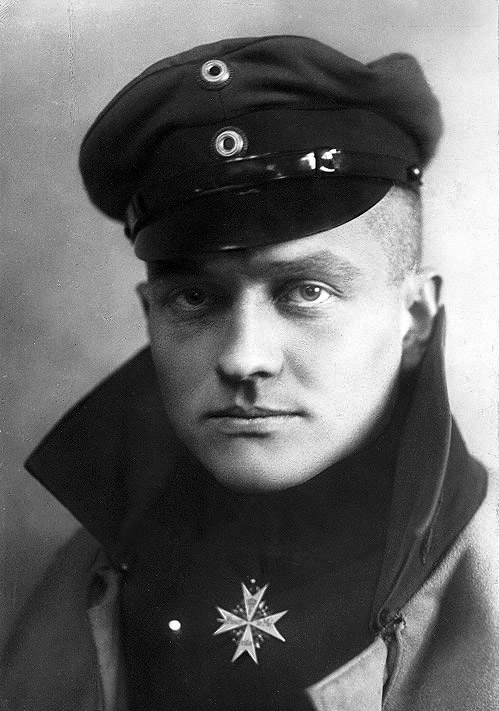
Manfred von Richthofen, aka "The Red Baron".

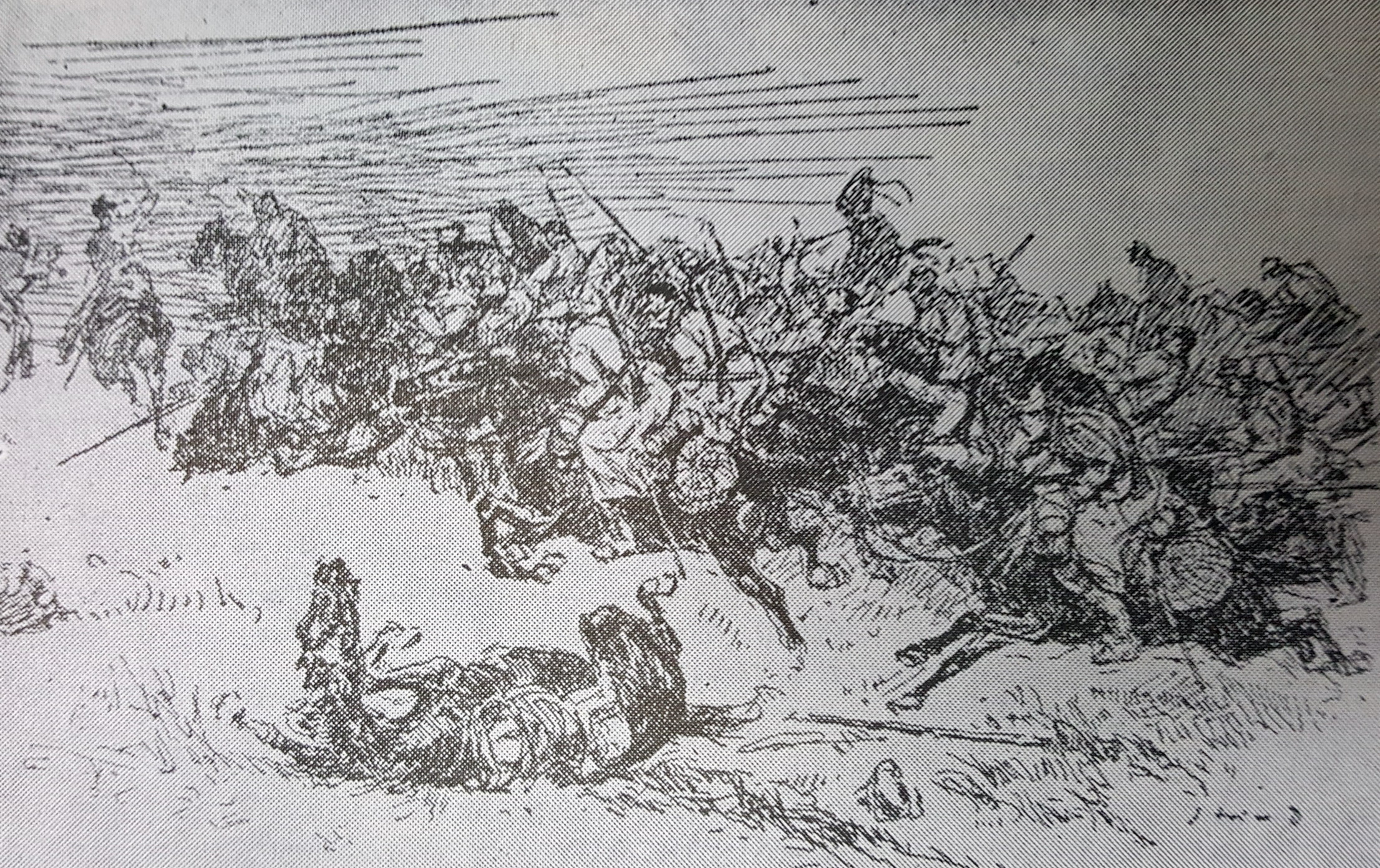
Romanian cavalry charge during the Battle of Bazargic.

"The Battle of Tutrakan" by Dimitar Giudzhenov.

The following events occurred in September 1916:

== September 1, 1916 (Friday) ==
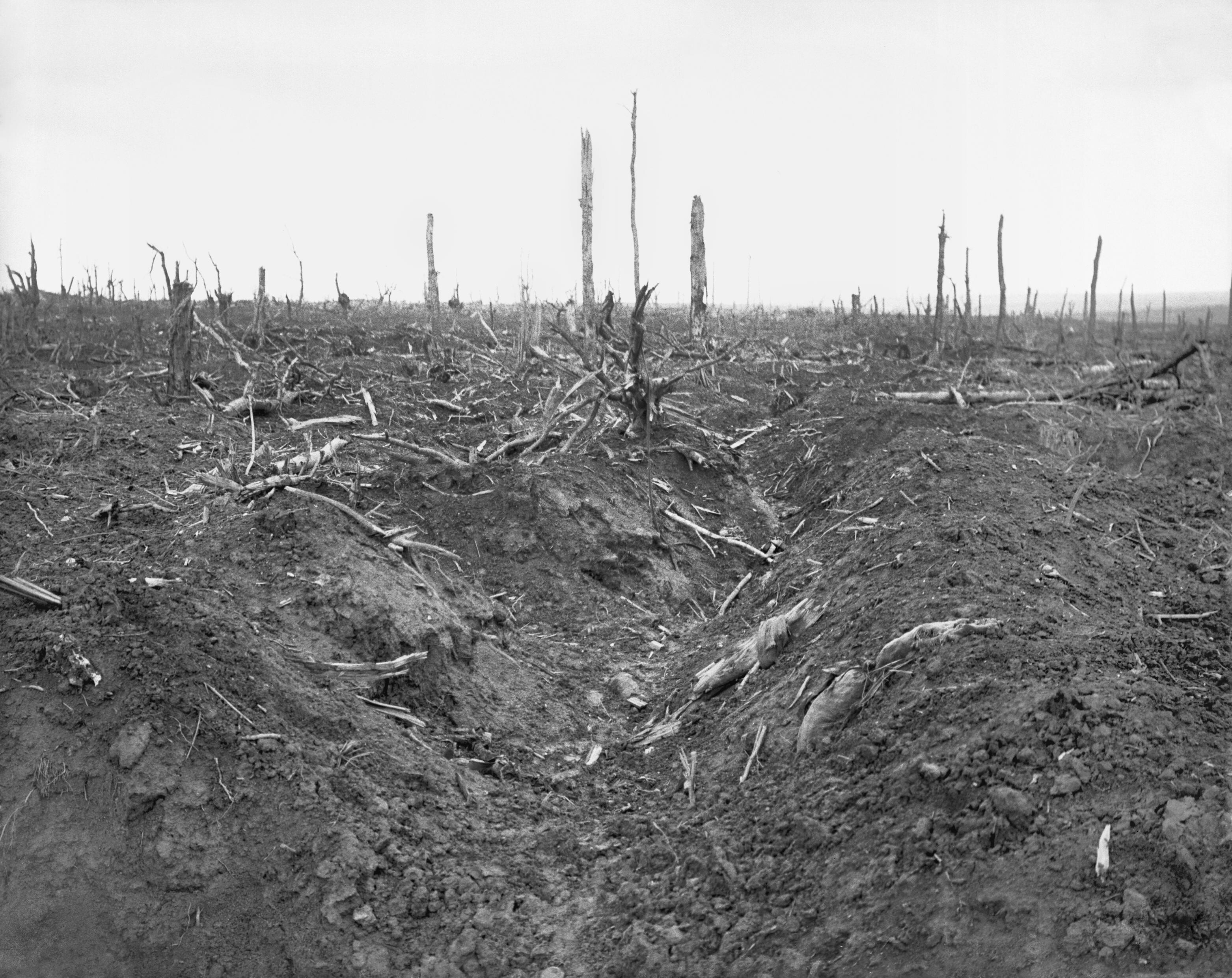
Abandoned German trench in Delville Wood, September 1916

- Bulgaria declared war on Romania, and went on to take the city of Dobruja.
- Battle of Delville Wood – British efforts to regain ground lost to Germans on August 31 were hampered by bombing and sniper fire.
- U.S. President Woodrow Wilson signed the Keating–Owen Act, named after its sponsors Edward Keating and Robert Latham Owen, into law to go into effect a year later. The Act addressed child labor issues by prohibiting the sale of goods across state line if they come from factories that employed children under fourteen. However, the act was ruled unconstitutional by the Supreme Court of the United States nine months after it went into effect.
- The city of Berlin, Ontario officially changed its name to Kitchener in memory of the late British general Herbert Kitchener, and in accordance with a referendum to change the name in May due to Canada being part of the Allies against Germany in World War I.
- W. B. Yeats wrote the poem Easter, 1916, based on the Easter Rising.
- The Albanian Literary Commission was established by Austrian diplomat August Ritter von Kral, and would eventually include such Albanian literary figures as Gjergj Fishta, Luigj Gurakuqi, Hilë Mosi, Aleksander Xhuvani, Maximilian Lambertz, Gjergj Pekmezi, Ndre Mjeda, and Sotir Peçi.
- The association football club Sportivo Dock Sud was established in Avellaneda Partido, Argentina.
- Born:
  - Dorothy Cheney, American tennis player, four-time U.S. Open champion, first American woman to win the Australian Open in 1938, also champion at the French Open and Wimbledon in 1946; in Los Angeles, United States (d. 2014)
  - Joseph Minish, American politician, U.S. Representative from New Jersey from 1963 to 1985; in Throop, Pennsylvania, United States (d. 2007)

== September 2, 1916 (Saturday) ==
- Battle of Transylvania – The Romanian Army captured the city of Orșova, Transylvania, which was then part of Austria-Hungary, before advancing towards the outskirts of Sibiu and completing the first phase of its offense against the Central Powers.
- Battle of Turtucaia – The Bulgarian Third Army surrounded a Romanian garrison at Turtucaia (then part of Romania), as it opened a new offensive against the newest ally to the Entente.
- Royal Flying Corps pilot Lieutenant Leefe Robinson, flying a Royal aircraft, shot down the German Army airship SL 11, near London, killing her entire crew of 16. Leefe Robinson became the second pilot to shoot down an airship and the first to do it over Great Britain, receiving the Victoria Cross for his action three days later.
- The Fitzroy Football Club won the 20th Victoria Football League Grand Final, defeating Carlton by a margin of 29 points at the Melbourne Cricket Ground before a crowd of 21,130 spectators. The title was a huge upset for Fitzroy as the club finished last in the regular season, making it the sixth time it won the premiership.

== September 3, 1916 (Sunday) ==
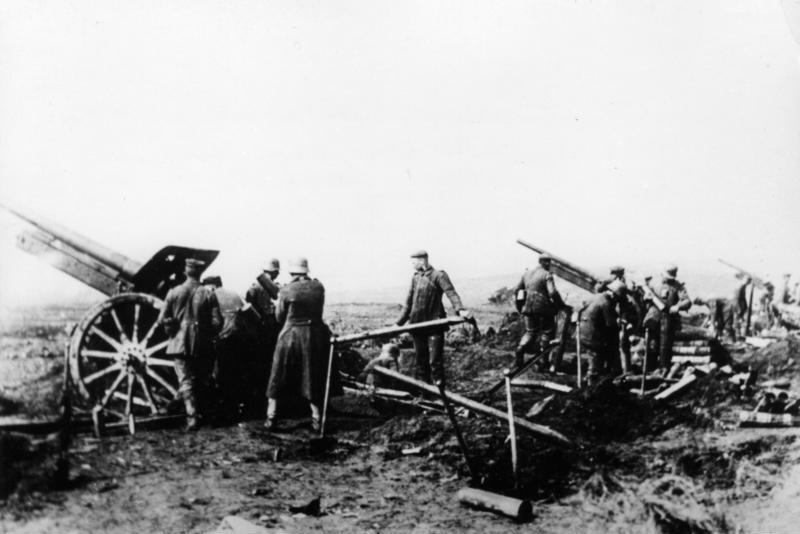
German artillery at the Battle of Guillemont

- Battle of Transylvania – The Romanian Army crossed the Olt river in the second phase of its offensive to conquer Transylvania from the Austro—Hungarians.
- Battle of Guillemont – The British and French launched an assault involved six divisions to capture the village of Guillemont in northeastern France.
- Battle of Delville Wood – The British continued to suffer failed attacks on the east end of Delville Wood in France.
- Battle of Verdun – French counterattacks on German flanks pushed the line further back from Verdun.
- In the largest airship raid of World War I, 12 German Navy and four German Army airships bombed southeast England. The airships dropped 823 bombs totaling 38,979 pounds (17,681 kg), killing four people and injuring 12 and causing over £21,000 in damage.
- The U.S. government passed the Adamson Act, named after U.S. Representative William C. Adamson, which established the eight-hour workday for rail workers. Although the practice existed earlier with Ford Motors, the legislation popularized the eight-hour day for other industries.
- British flying ace Henry Evans was shot down by ground fire over northern France while doing an offensive patrol for the British Fourth Army. He had five confirmed kills at the time giving him the title of flying ace.
- Born:
  - Tommy J. Smith, Australian horse trainer, dominated and won the Sydney Trainers' Premiership every year between 1953 and 1985, notable horses trained included Tulloch, Gunsynd, Kingston Town, Redcraze and Red Anchor; as Thomas John Smith, in Jembaicumbene, Australia (d. 1998)
  - Doug Bentley, Canadian hockey player, left wing for the Chicago Blackhawks and New York Rangers from 1939 to 1954; in Delisle, Saskatchewan, Canada (d. 1972)
- Died:
  - Kenneth Hutchings, 33, English cricketer, played for Kent County Cricket Club and the England cricket team between 1902 and 1912; killed in action at the Battle of the Somme (b. 1882)
  - Armand du Paty de Clam, 63, French army officer, chief investigator in the Dreyfus affair; died of his wounds from the First Battle of the Marne (b. 1853)
  - Horace Thomas, 26, Welsh rugby player, played half for Barbarian from 1911 to 1912 and the Wales national rugby union team from 1912 to 1913; killed in action at the Battle of the Somme (b. 1890)

== September 4, 1916 (Monday) ==
- Battle of Verdun – Some 474 French troops died in a fire in the Tavannes railway tunnel.
- Battle of Guillemont – British forces occupied the village of Guillemont, France.
- Battle of Delville Wood – A last attempt to assault German defenses on the east end of Delville Wood, France, ended in failure.
- Born:
  - Harry L. Carrico, American judge, Chief Justice of the Supreme Court of Virginia from 1981 to 2003; as Harry Lee Carrico, in Washington, D.C., United States (d. 2013)
  - Nathan Green Gordon, American naval officer and politician, 7th Lieutenant Governor of Arkansas, recipient of the Medal of Honor for rescue missions during World War II; in Morrilton, Arkansas, United States (d. 2008)
- Died: José Echegaray, 84, Spanish writer, recipient of the Nobel Prize in Literature for works including the play El gran Galeoto (b. 1832)

== September 5, 1916 (Tuesday) ==
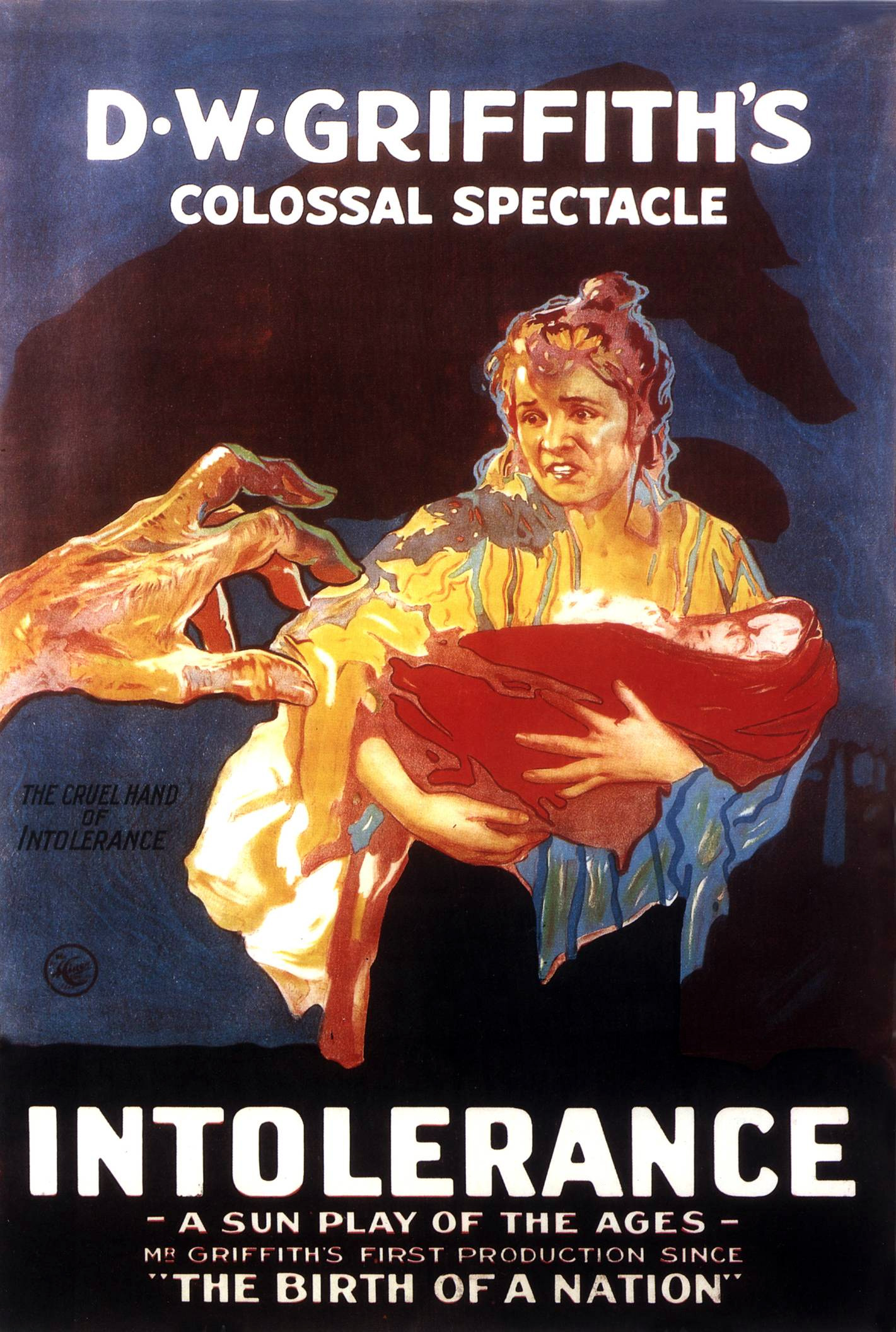
Movie poster of Intolerance by D. W. Griffith

- Battle of Bazargic – The Bulgarian Third Army engaged Romanian forces at Dobrich, Southern Dobruja, the southeastern region that borders Bulgaria and Romania.
- Battle of Delville Wood – British forces dug in at the west end of Delville Wood in France, ending the battle. Despite not being able to push the Germans completely out of the wood, the British were able to hold onto much of the key positions gained in the opening battle.
- Battle of Guillemont – British troops tried to force attacks on trenches near Combles, France. German defenses delayed progress.
- Filmmaker D. W. Griffith released Intolerance: Love's Struggle Through the Ages in the United States. Starring Lillian Gish and Constance Talmadge, initial tepid response by the public had many industry forecasters deeming the $2.5 million film to be a commercial failure.
- Tennis player R. Norris Williams defeated Bill Johnston at the final of the U.S. National Championships at the West Side Tennis Club in Forest Hills, New York.
- Amateur snooker player Charles Jaques won the first annual English Amateur Championship in London, winning two of the three frames in the final by a score of 202 to 140½.
- Born:
  - Frank Shuster, Canadian comedian, part of the popular comedic duo Wayne and Shuster with Johnny Wayne, recipient of the Order of Canada; in Toronto, Canada (d. 2002)
  - Colleen Bevis, American activist, advocate for improved or new child welfare programs through Hillsborough County Public Schools in Florida; as Colleen Lunsford, in Hillsborough County, Florida, United States (d. 2013)

== September 6, 1916 (Wednesday) ==
- Battle of Turtucaia – Embattled Romanian forces at Turtucaia surrendered to Bulgaria, allowing 28,000 to be taken prisoner. Bulgaria also captured 150 cannons and 63 machine guns among other equipment. Bulgarian casualties were 1,517 killed, 7,407 wounded and 247 missing, while Romanian casualties were between 6,000 and 7,000 killed or wounded.
- Battle of Guillemont – British forces consolidated defenses on the road between Combles and Ginchy, France.
- The Imperial German Army reestablished the 9th Army for the Romanian campaign.
- The transport company Graakalbanen was established in Trondheim, Norway to build the Trondheim Tramway.
- The first true self-service grocery store, Piggly Wiggly, was founded in Memphis, Tennessee, by Clarence Saunders, opening 5 days later.

== September 7, 1916 (Thursday) ==
- Battle of Bazargic – Despite being outnumbered, the Bulgarian Third Army defeated Romania and pushed Allied forces out of Southern Dobruja. Bulgarian casualties were 1,053 killed and 2,324 wounded while Romanian casualties were unknown.
- Battle of Guillemont – Further assaults were called off due to strong German counteroffensives.
- Battle of Transylvania – Romanian forces captured Sfântu Gheorghe, Transylvania.
- Battle of Kisaki – A German colonial force of 2,200 men attacked 1,700 South African troops, with naval barrage support from the German light cruiser SMS Königsberg near the down of Kisaki in German East Africa (now Tanzania).
- The Merchant Marine Act established the United States Shipping Board.
- Died: Clara Bewick Colby, 70, American suffragist, founder and publisher of The Woman's Tribune; died of pneumonia and myocarditis (b. 1846)

== September 8, 1916 (Friday) ==
- Battle of Kisaki – An attempt to flank the advancing Germans at Kisaki, German East Africa failed and South African troops were routed.
- Romanian campaign – The Bulgarian port city of Silistra was evacuated as Romanian forces closed in to capture the city.
- United States Congress passed legislation to establish the U.S. Tariff Commission, the precursor to the United States International Trade Commission.
- 61-year-old Frank Welch, a government teamster, was killed by a grizzly bear named "Old Two Toes" while camped near Ten Mile Spring at Turbid Lake in Yellowstone National Park.
- Born:
  - Jim Bagby Jr., American baseball player, pitcher for the Boston Red Sox, Cleveland Indians, and Pittsburgh Pirates, son of Jim Bagby Sr.; as James Charles Jacob Bagby Jr., in Cleveland, United States (d. 1988)
  - Anita Lee Blair, American politician and activist, first woman with blindness to be elected to office, member of the Texas House of Representatives from 1952 to 1956; in Oklahoma City, United States (d. 2010)
  - Calel Perechodnik, Polish Jew collaborator, member of the Jewish Ghetto Police during the Nazi occupation of Poland, his diaries were published posthumously as Am I a Murderer?, in Otwock, Poland (killed during the Warsaw Uprising, 1944)

== September 9, 1916 (Saturday) ==
- Battle of Ginchy – The Irish 16th Division captured the German-held village of Ginchy in northeastern France at a cost of 4,330 casualties.
- General Erich von Falkenhayn, recently fired from the German General Staff, was given command of the German 9th Army to counter the Romanian offensive in Transylvania.
- The first prototype of the Bristol fighterplane was flown.
- Emily Griffith Opportunity School opened to female students in Denver.
- The War Merit Cross was established by German noble Frederick II, the last Grand Duchy of Baden to recognize war and volunteer service on the home front.
- South Fremantle defeated East Fremantle by a 19-point margin to win their first West Australian Football League premiership.
- Born: John D. Lavelle, American air force officer, commander of the Seventh Air Force during the Vietnam War; as John Daniel Lavelle, in Cleveland, United States (d. 1979)
- Died: Tom Kettle, 36, Irish poet, best known for his poem "To My Daughter Betty, the Gift of God" and his friendship with James Joyce; killed in action at the Battle of the Somme (b. 1880)

== September 10, 1916 (Sunday) ==
- Battle of Transylvania – The Romanian Army completed the second phase of its offensive against Austria-Hungary with complete control of Burzenland, the southeastern region of Transylvania.
- The German air squadron Jagdstaffel 8 was established in the Imperial German Flying Corps.
- Born: Jack M. Campbell, American politician, 21st Governor of New Mexico; as John Moren Campbell, in Hutchinson, Kansas, United States (d. 1999)
- Died: Silas Robbins, 59, American lawyer, first African American to practice law in Nebraska and be a member of the Nebraska State Bar Association; committed suicide (b. 1857)

== September 11, 1916 (Monday) ==
- Battle of Transylvania – The Romanian Army commenced the third phase of conquering Transylvania, leading to the capture of commune of Merești, forcing a river crossing at Rupea, and establishing a bridgehead to conquer the commune of Dăișoara.
- Battle of Kisaki – Facing decisive defeat, South Africa called off its attack on Kisaki in German East Africa.
- A mechanical failure caused the central span of the Quebec Bridge, a cantilever-type structure, to crash into the Saint Lawrence River for the second time, killing 13 workers. It had collapsed previously in 1907, killing 75 out of 86 workers.
- Jefferson High School in Los Angeles opened its doors to students with 24 faculty members and two of its buildings completed.
- Born:
  - Warren Bonython, Australian chemist and conservationist, leading proponent to the creation of the Heysen Trail; as Charles Warren Bonython, in Adelaide, Australia (d. 2012)
  - Barrie Heath, British fighter pilot and business executive, recipient for the Distinguished Flying Cross for action during the Battle of Britain and chairman of auto and aerospace conglomerate GKN from 1975 to 1980; in Kings Norton, England (d. 1988)
  - Frithjof Tidemand-Johannessen, Norwegian designer, best known wood and graphic arts, and his decorative works on the Torshov Church in Oslo; as Carl Frithjof Tidemand-Johannessen (d. 1958)
- Died:
  - Janet Achurch, 53, English actress and stage manager, best known for producing the plays of Henrik Ibsen to the British audience, including A Doll's House; died of morphine poisoning (b. 1864)
  - Thomas Lemuel James, 85, American public servant, 29th United States Postmaster General (b. 1831)

== September 12, 1916 (Tuesday) ==
- Battle of Kaymakchalan – The Serbian First Army assaulted Bulgarian forces stationed at Kajmakčalan, a strategic mountain in Macedonia.
- Battle of Malka Nidzhe – The Monastir Offensive began in Macedonia with Allied forces assaulting a Bulgarian force of 8,000 men outside of Lerin (now part of Greece).
- Farrukh Gayibov, the first Russian pilot of Azerbaijani ancestry and decorated with Order of Saint Anna and the Order of St. George, went missing in action during a bombing run and declared dead six days later.
- During a circus parade put on by Sparks World Famous Shows in Sullivan County, Tennessee, Mary, a circus elephant, suddenly flew into a rage and hurled her handler Walter "Red" Eldridge off his perch before trampling him to death. Eldridge, a transient, had been hired as an assistant elephant trainer the day before, and conflicting eyewitness accounts suggested he may have accidentally provoked the elephant.
- Born:
  - Edward Binns, American actor, known for roles in 12 Angry Men, Fail Safe and Patton; in Philadelphia, United States (d. 1990)
  - Han Suyin, Chinese-born Swiss novelist, known for novels A Many-Splendoured Thing, The Crippled Tree and And the Rain My Drink; as Rosalie Matilda Kuanghu Chou, in Xinyang, Republic of China (present-day China) (d. 2012)
  - Henri van Praag, Dutch academic, leading researcher in theology and psychology; as Naphthali ben Levi van Praag, in Amsterdam, Netherlands (d. 1988)

== September 13, 1916 (Wednesday) ==
- Bowing to public pressure, circus owner Charlie Sparks transported Mary, a circus elephant that had killed her handler the day before, to a rail yard in Erwin, Tennessee where before a crowd of 2,500 people she was hung from a rail-car mounted industrial crane until dead. An autopsy performed on the elephant afterward discovered Mary had a severely infected tooth. Eyewitnesses had seen her handler feed her a watermelon rind on the side of the mouth of the infected tooth seconds before she erupted in anger and killed him.
- Born:
  - Roald Dahl, Welsh children's writer, author of James and the Giant Peach, Charlie and the Chocolate Factory, Matilda, Fantastic Mr Fox, and The BFG; in Llandaff, Wales (d. 1990)
  - John Currie Gunn, Scottish physicist, best known for his participating in developing the linear electron accelerator for nuclear physics research; in Glasgow, Scotland (d. 2002)
- Died: William Hayes Pope, 46, American judge, first judge of the United States District Court for the District of New Mexico (b. 1870)

== September 14, 1916 (Thursday) ==
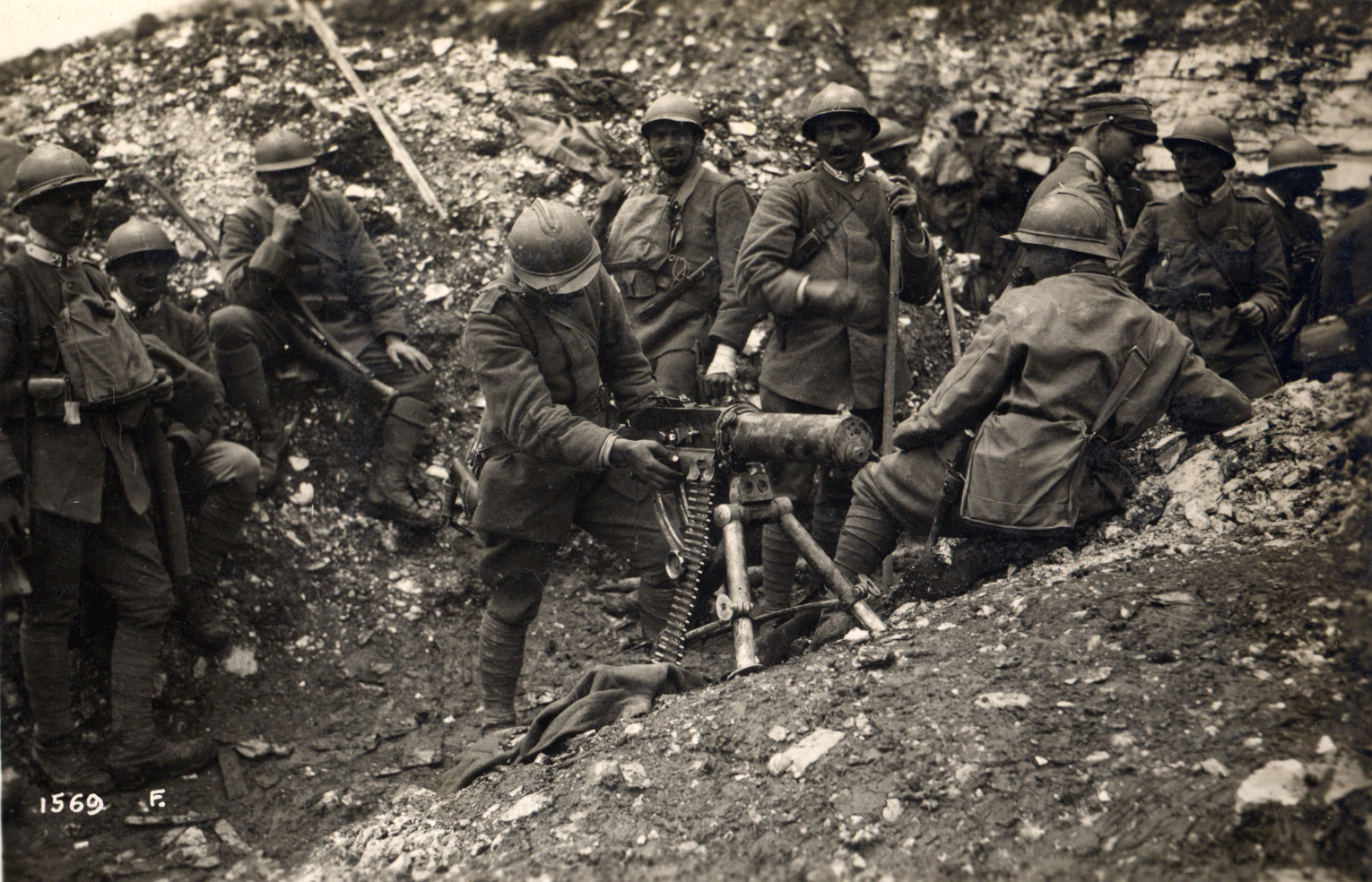
Italian troops capture an Austrian machine gun during the Seventh Battle of the Isonzo.

- Seventh Battle of the Isonzo – Italy attempted to capitalize on its bridgehead established at Gorizia, Italy with assaults on Miren-Kostanjevica in what is now Slovenia.
- Battle of Malka Nidzhe – Bulgaria was pushed back by Allied assaults to Banitsa and Lerin Macedonia, opening western parts of the Macedonian front to further attacks. The Bulgarians sustained 1,693 casualties and lost 34 artillery pieces.
- Battle of Kisaki – Paul von Lettow-Vorbeck, commander of German forces in German East Africa, orders his troops to relocate from Kisaki and establish a new base at Beho-Beho.
- Born:
  - Donald Blackburn, American military officer, led American guerrilla resistance in the Philippines during World War II, commander of U.S. Special Forces operation during the Vietnam War, recipient of the Silver Star; in McLean, Virginia, United States (d. 2008)
  - Cledwyn Hughes, Welsh politician, Member of Parliament from 1950 to 1979, cabinet minister under the Harold Wilson administration; in Holyhead, Wales (d. 2001)
  - John Heyer, Australian documentary filmmaker, best known for the documentary The Back of Beyond; in Devonport, Tasmania, Australia (d. 2001)
  - Franklin Patterson, American academic, first president of Hampshire College, co-author of the New College Plan; in Ellsworth, Iowa, United States (d. 1994)
  - Eric Bentley, British-born American playwright and theatre critic, columnist for The New Republic; in Bolton, England (d. 2020)
- Died:
  - Pierre Duhem, 55, French physicist, leading researcher in chemical thermodynamics, fluid dynamics and theory of elasticity (b. 1861)
  - Josiah Royce, 60, American philosopher, one of the leading proponents of objective idealism (b. 1855)

== September 15, 1916 (Friday) ==
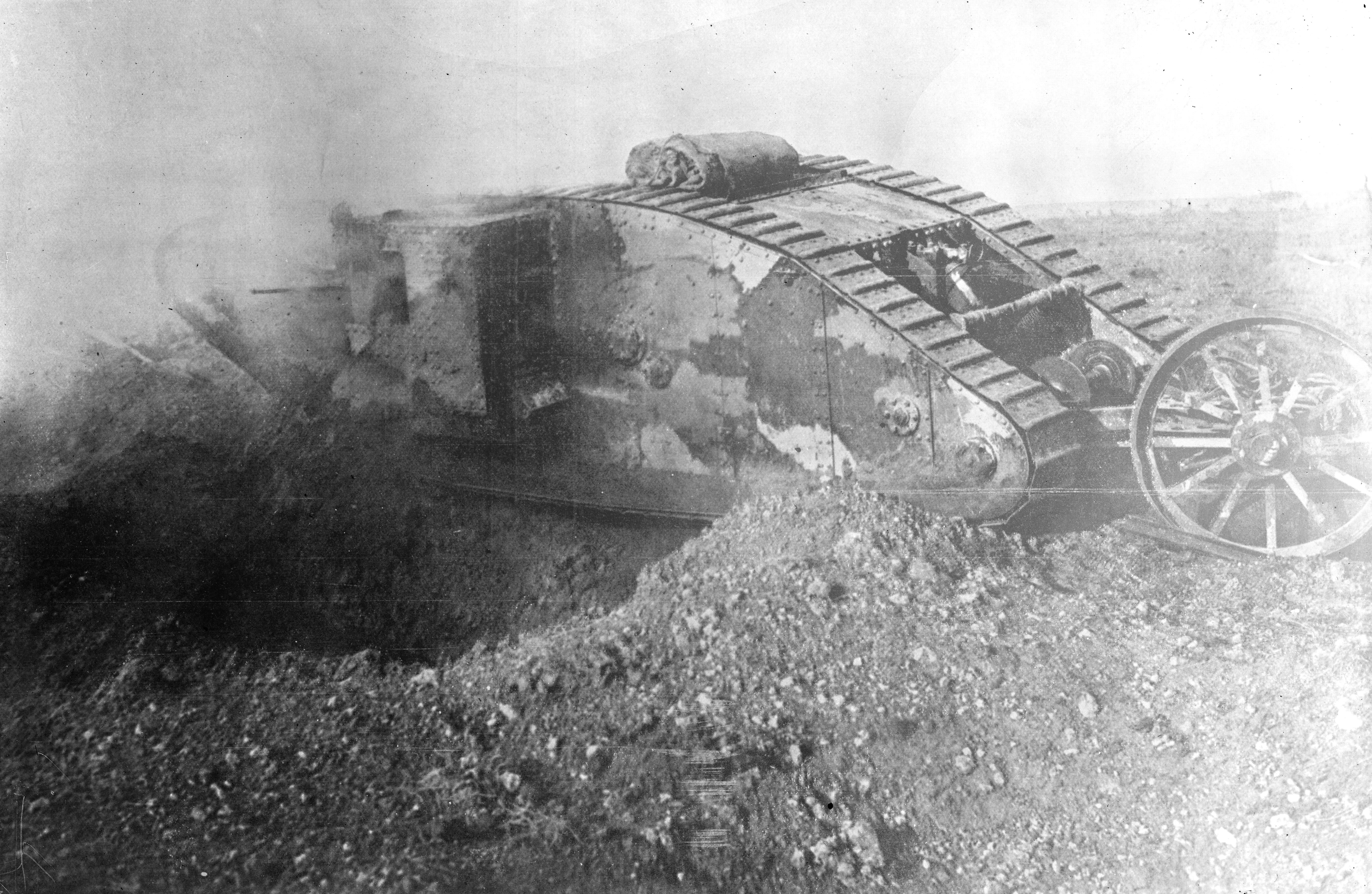
Mark I series tank

- Battle of Flers–Courcelette – The French Sixth Army and British Fourth Army and Reserve Army, with support by the Canadian Corps and New Zealand Division, launched a massive attack against German First Army around Flers, France, resulting in the capture of the German-held villages of Courcelette and Martinpuich.
  - The Canadian Corps and New Zealand Division fought for the first time in the Battle of the Somme.
  - The British Mark I armoured fighting vehicle was deployed in battle, the first time the tank was used in warfare.
  - Noted casualties on the first day of fighting included Raymond Asquith, son of British Prime Minister H. H. Asquith, and Guy Baring, one of the 22 British Members of Parliament killed during World War I.
- Two Austro-Hungarian aircraft attacked and damaged the French submarine Foucault, forcing the crew to scuttle her. It was the first recorded time aircraft were able to successfully attack and destroy a vessel, although the British submarine HMS B-10 had been damaged by aircraft and taken out of service a month before.
- The Royal Flying Corps established the No. 76 Squadron.
- The 18th Avenue, 20th Avenue, 71st Street and 79th Street elevated train stations opened in New York City.
- The weekly newspaper The National Leader began publication in Brisbane, Australia but would cease publication in 1919.
- Born:
  - Margaret Lockwood, British actress, best known for her roles in British films including The Lady Vanishes and Cast a Dark Shadow; in Karachi, British India (present-day Pakistan) (d. 1990)
  - Marie Vieux-Chauvet, Haitian novelist, author of Fille d'Haïti La Danse sur le Volcan and Fonds des Nègres; as Marie Vieux, in Port-au-Prince, Haiti (d. 1973)
  - Frederick C. Weyand, American army officer, Chief of Staff of the United States Army from 1974 to 1976; in Arbuckle, California, United States (d. 2010)
  - Abbas Guliyev, Soviet army officer, recipient of the Hero of the Soviet Union for action during the Lublin–Brest Offensive during World War II; in Şəkərabad, Russian Empire (now Azerbaijan) (d. 1998)
- Died:
  - Julius Fučík, 44, Serbian composer, known for dance and march compositions including "Entrance of the Gladiators" (b. 1872)
  - Basil W. Duke, 78, American army officer, general for the Confederate States Army during the American Civil War, leading preserver of Civil War historic sites including the site of the Battle of Shiloh (b. 1838)

== September 16, 1916 (Saturday) ==
- Battle of Flers–Courcelette – Advances were severely limited on the second day of battle but British soldiers did capture and hold the road between Ginchy and Lesbœufs, France, from the Germans, the third major objective in the battle.
- The Amsterdam Airport Schiphol was first established as a military air base but would see civilian use in 1919.
- Two Imperial German Navy airships, the Zeppelins L 6 and L 9, were destroyed by fire in their hangar due to an inflation accident.
- The German air squadron Jagdstaffel 13 was established in the Imperial German Flying Corps.
- Born:
  - Robert Llewellyn Bradshaw, West Indian state leader, first Premier of Saint Kitts and Nevis; in Saint Paul Capisterre, Saint Christopher-Nevis-Anguilla (present-day Saint Kitts) (d. 1978)
  - Frank Farrell, Australian rugby player, played for Newtown, the New South Wales rugby league team and the Australia national rugby league team between 1938 and 1951; as Francis Michael Farrell, in Surry Hills, New South Wales, Australia (d. 1985)
  - Barney F. Hajiro, American soldier, member of the 442nd Infantry Regiment that rescued the Lost Battalion during World War II, one of 21 Asian Americans to receive the Medal of Honor; in the Territory of Hawaii (present-day Hawaii) (d. 2009)
  - M. S. Subbulakshmi, Indian singer, renowned vocalist specializing in Carnatic music; as Madurai Shanmukhavadivu Subbulakshmi, in Madura, Madras Presidency, British India (present-day Madurai, Tamil Nadu, India) (d. 2004)
  - Jerzy Wójcik, Polish Olympic fencer; in Wodzisław Śląski, Poland (d. 2004)
- Died: Frank McGee, 33, Canadian hockey player, top scorer for the Ottawa Hockey Club and Stanley Cup champion; killed in action at the Battle of the Somme) (b. 1882)

== September 17, 1916 (Sunday) ==
- Seventh Battle of the Isonzo – Heavy casualties forced Italy to call off further attacks on Austria-Hungary in what is now Slovenia. Italian casualties were 17,000 while Austria-Hungary had 15,000 casualties.
- Battle of Flers–Courcelette – British forces closed in on the French village of Gueudecourt, France, but heavy German resistance prevented them from entering.
- Battle of Verdun – The French ended a successful series of counterattacks against the Germans, setting themselves up for a massive offensive campaign in October.
- First Battle of Cobadin – The Bulgarian Third Army and the combined Russian-Romanian Dobruja Army fought at Rasova, Cobadin, Romania.
- Flying an Albatros, German Rittmeister Manfred von Richthofen scored his first kill, shooting down a Royal aircraft of the British No. 11 Squadron over Villers-Plouich, France, and mortally wounding pilot Lionel Morris and his observer Tom Rees. He would go on to become the highest-scoring flying ace of World War I, with 80 victories, and be given the legendary title The Red Baron.
- The Gamla Ullevi football stadium was opened in Gothenburg, Sweden with a tied game between association football clubs Göteborg and Akademisk Boldklub (2–2), and operated until 1958.
- Born:
  - Mary Stewart, English fantasy and mystery writer, best known for her Merlin Trilogy which included The Crystal Cave, The Hollow Hills and The Last Enchantment; as Mary Florence Elinor Rainbow, in Sunderland, England (d. 2014)
  - William G. Thrash, American marine officer, recipient of the Silver Star and Legion of Merit for action during the Korean War; as William Gay Thrash, in Tifton, Georgia, United States (d. 2011)
  - Yumjaagiin Tsedenbal, Mongolian state leader, General Secretary of Mongolia from 1940 to 1984; in Bayan Chandamani Uula banner, Bogd Khanate of Mongolia (present-day Davst, Uvs Province, Mongolia) (d. 1991)
  - Karthika Thirunal Lakshmi Bayi, Indian noble, last Queen of Travancore; in Travancore, British India (present-day India) (d. 2008)
- Died: Seth Low, 66, American politician, 92nd Mayor of New York City; died of cancer (b. 1850)

== September 18, 1916 (Monday) ==
- Battle of Transylvania – The Romanian Army ended the third phase of its offensive against Austria-Hungary when German forces halted the advance at Hațeg, Transylvania.
- Battle of Flers–Courcelette – French forces made a surprise attack on the German-held village of Combles, France.
- The Imperial German Army established Armee-Abteilung Gronau under command of General Hans von Gronau.
- The Beaux-Arts Institute of Design was established by Lloyd Warren in New York City.
- Born: John Jacob Rhodes, American politician, U.S. Representative of Arizona from 1953 to 1983, House Minority Leader from 1973 to 1981; in Council Grove, Kansas, United States (d. 2003)
- Died:
  - Rupert Inglis, 53, English clergy and rugby player, member of the England national rugby union team in 1888, and Church of England rector for Frittenden, England; killed in action at the Battle of the Somme) (b. 1863)
  - Aleksander Sulkiewicz, 48, Polish revolutionary leader, co-founder of the Polish Socialist Party; killed in action (b. 1867)

== September 19, 1916 (Tuesday) ==
- First Battle of Cobadin – The Russian-Romanian Dobruja Army defeated the Bulgarian Third Army and supporting German and Ottoman forced at Rasova, Cobadin, Romania, inflicting a total 740 killed, 5,126 wounded and 673 missing. Russian and Romanian casualties were not recorded.
- Battle of Flers–Courcelette – A New Zealand force pushed to occupy a key German trench named Flers.
- The No. 3 Squadron of the Australian Flying Corps was established at Point Cook, Victoria, Australia under command of David Blake as a unit of the Australian Flying Corps.
- A bloody gang war erupted in Chicago between the Egan's Rats and the Bottoms Gang after former Rats leader Harry "Cherries" Dunn was gunned down outside a bar by former gang members Willie Egan and Walter Costello.
- The musical comedy Theodore & Co by H. M. Harwood and George Grossmith Jr., with music by Ivor Novello and Jerome Kern, opened at the Gaiety Theatre in London and would run 503 performances.

== September 20, 1916 (Wednesday) ==
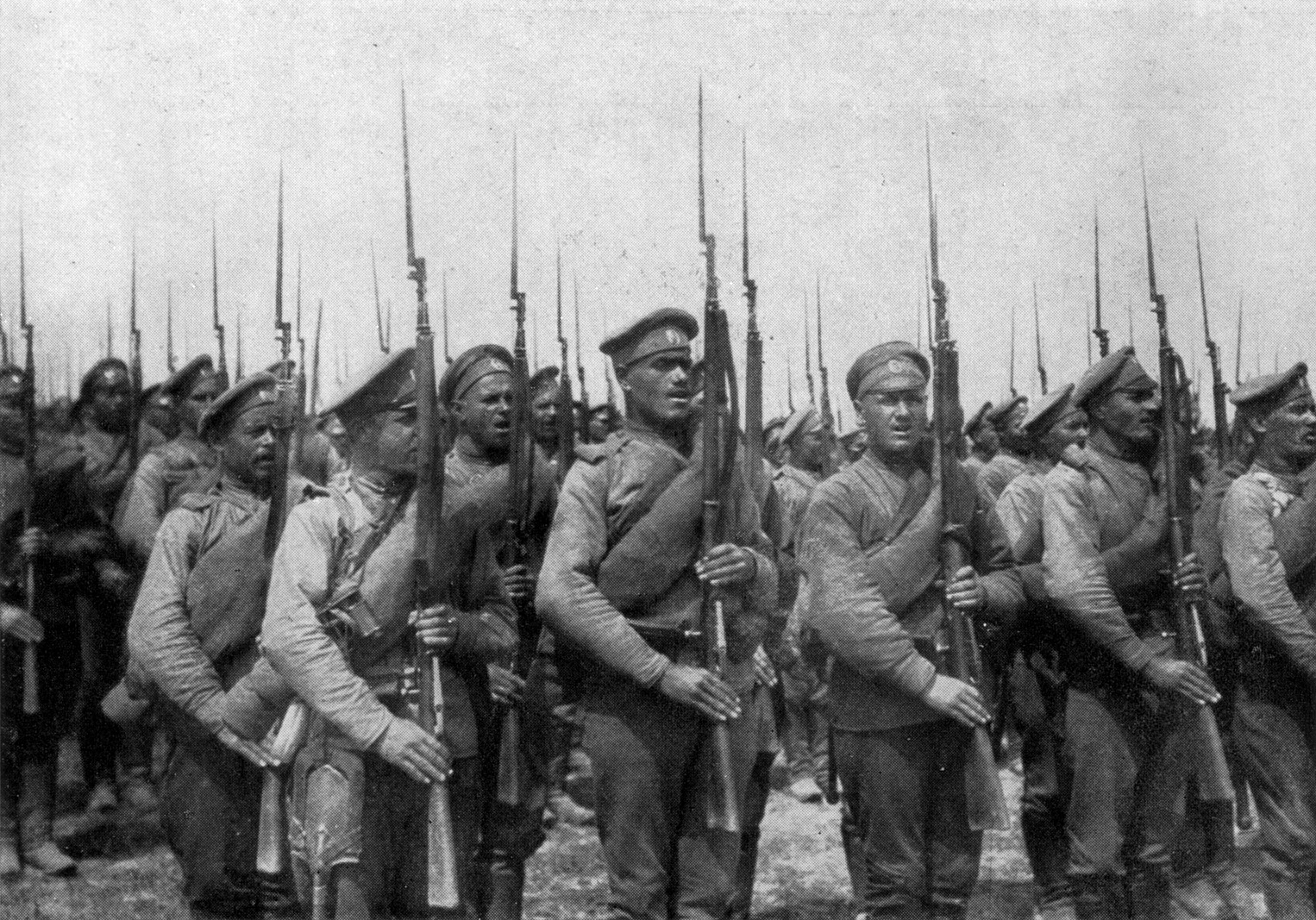
Russian infantry during the Brusilov Offensive.

- Brusilov Offensive – Russian general Aleksei Brusilov was able to push the Imperial Russian Army to the Carpathian Mountains that bordered between Galicia (now Ukraine) and Romania, making it the most successful Russian military operation during the war. Casualties were massive on both sides, with estimates ranging from 500,000 to a million Russian casualties while the Central Powers has between 950,000 and 1.325 million.
- Battle of Flers–Courcelette – New Zealand forces occupied Flers Trench where they repulsed a German counterattack.
- New Zealand aviation pioneer Henry Wigram established the Canterbury Aviation Company in Christchurch to train pilots for service in World War I, promote local aviation defence and pioneer commercial aviation in New Zealand.
- The No. 2 Squadron of the Australian Flying Corps was established in El Qantara, Egypt as a unit of the Australian Flying Corps.
- The Grand Theatre in Perth, Australia opened to the public to showcase movies and live performances. It was renovated twice before being demolished in 1990.
- Born: Malik Meraj Khalid, Pakistani politician, founding member of the Pakistan Peoples Party and acting Prime Minister of Pakistan from 1996 to 1997, in Kot Radha Kishan, British India (present-day Pakistan) (d. 2003)
- Died: August Leskien, 76, German linguist, specialist in Baltic and Slavic languages and developer of the Neogrammarian approach to linguistic study (b. 1840)

== September 21, 1916 (Thursday) ==
- Battle of Flers–Courcelette – Scouting parties discovered the Germans had given up two more key trenches to the British.
- The German air squadron Jagdstaffel 7 was established in the Imperial German Flying Corps.
- The Vicariate Apostolic of Eastern Honan (later the Roman Catholic Archdiocese of Kaifeng) was established in China.
- Born:
  - Tito Canepa, Dominican artist, best known works included the triptych Enriquillo – Duarte – Luperón; as Tito Enrique Canepa Jiménez, in San Pedro de Macorís, Dominican Republic (d. 2014)
  - Ewing Kauffman, American business and sports executive, founder and owner of the Kansas City Royals baseball club; in Garden City, Missouri, United States (d. 1993)

== September 22, 1916 (Friday) ==
- Battle of Flers–Courcelette – British forces consolidated their units around the French villages of Courcelette and Flers to end the battle, delivering a decisive blow to the Germans on the Western Front. British casualties for the operations were 29,376 while German casualties were 13,000.
- Arab Revolt – Arab forces under command of Abdullah I bin al-Hussein wrested control of the city of Ta'if from the Ottomans after three months of fighting.

== September 23, 1916 (Saturday) ==
- Battle of Kaymakchalan – Casualties for Serbia reached 10,000 while Bulgarian units dwindled to an average of 90 men, forcing many to retreat back towards the town Mariovo in Macedonia.
- Twelve German Navy Zeppelins attack England. London was hit by two airships, with 23 civilians killed and 45 injured, along with dozens of homes and businesses destroyed. However, the Germans lose two airships, including the entire crew of L 32 including German air naval commander Peter Strasser.
- A German squadron of five airplanes, led by Manfred von Richthofen (later known as the "Red Baron"), attacked and destroyed an entire British squadron over the Somme battlefield, including British pilot Herbert Bellerby, Richthofen's second kill during the war.
- American pilot Kiffin Rockwell was mortally wounded and crashed while flying a reconnaissance mission over France, becoming the second American airman to die in combat.
- Chevrolet opened a car manufacturing plant in Elmhurst, Oakland, California to produce its new Chevrolet Series 490 for the American West Coast market. The plant would be bought out by General Motors and cease operation in 1963.
- The Pittsburgh, Westmoreland and Somerset Railroad was disbanded after the local mountain lumber industry it serviced ended operations due to deforestation.
- Born:
  - Aldo Moro, Italian state leader, 38th Prime Minister of Italy; in Maglie, Kingdom of Italy (present-day Italy) (d. 1978)
  - Frank S. Emi, American activist, advocated for rights of Japanese Americans during World War II; as Frank Seishi Emi, in Los Angeles, United States (d. 2010)
  - William W. Momyer, American air force officer, deputy commander of Military Assistance Command in Vietnam and operating commander of Operation Rolling Thunder; as William Wallace Momyer, in Muskogee, Oklahoma, United States (d. 2012)
  - Karel Kuttelwascher, Czech air force officer, member of the Royal Air Force during World War II, recipient of the Distinguished Flying Cross and Croix de Guerre; in Svatý Kříž, Austria-Hungary (present-day Havlíčkův Brod, Czech Republic) (d. 1959)

== September 24, 1916 (Sunday) ==
- Royal Flying Corps pilot Lieutenant Frederick Sowrey forced German Navy Zeppelin L 33 to crash land at Little Wigborough, England, where the airship crew were captured, the only armed enemy personnel set foot in England during World War I.
- Born:
  - Ruth Leach Amonette, American business executive, first female executive and vice-president at IBM; as Ruth Leach, in Oakland, California, United States (d. 2004)
  - Chidananda Saraswati, Indian spiritual leader, second president of the Divine Life Society; as Sridhar Rao, in Mangalore, British India (present-day India) (d. 2008)
  - Cedric Charles Dickens, British literary steward, great-grandson to Charles Dickens and president of the Dickens Fellowship; in London, England (d. 2006)
  - Leon Klinghoffer, American manufacturer, murdered by the Palestinian Liberation Front during the 1985 hijacking of the cruise ship Achille Lauro; in Kenilworth, New Jersey, United States (murdered, 1985)

== September 25, 1916 (Monday) ==
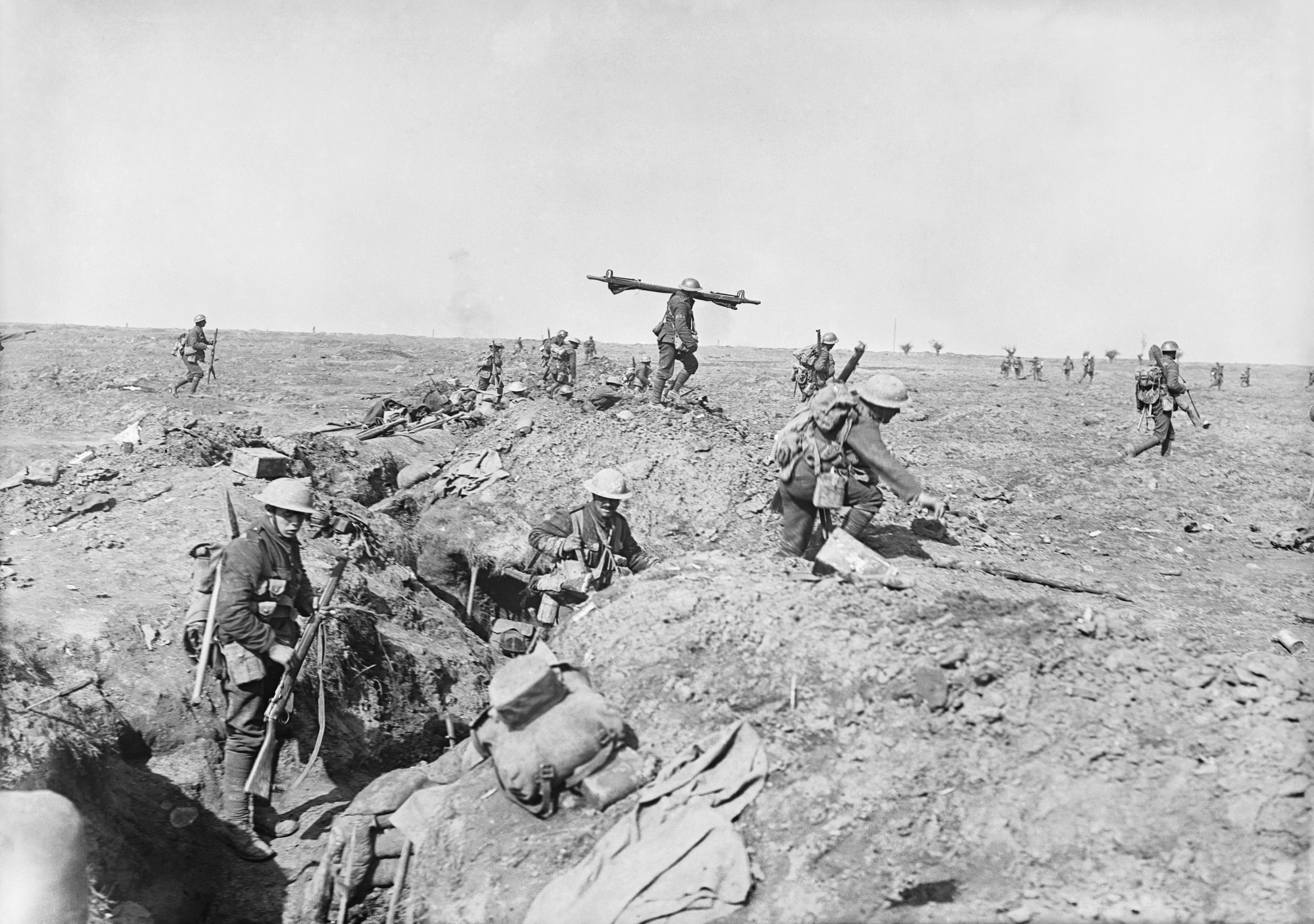
British infantry at Morval, 25 September 1916.

- Battle of Morval – The British Fourth Army and French Sixth Army attacked the German First Army at Morval, France, in a continuation of the Battle of Flers–Courcelette. The attack yielded successes on the first day of battle with the capture of the French village of Lesbœufs.
- Nine German Navy Zeppelins set out to attack England but only one created significant damage, bombing an arms factory in Sheffield that killed 28 and injured 19 people.
- Bulgarian General Kliment Boyadzhiev was replaced by General Dimitar Geshov as commander of the Bulgarian First Army.
- Virginia Episcopal School was established as a college preparatory school in Lynchburg, Virginia by Reverend Robert Carter Jett.
- The Majestic Record Corporation was established in New York City but folded within a year.
- Japanese Government Railways extended the Echigo Line in the Niigata Prefecture, Japan, with station Raihai serving the line.
- Born:
  - Jessica Anderson, Australian writer, author of Tirra Lirra by the River and The Impersonators; as Jessica Margaret Queale, in Gayndah, Australia (d. 2010)
  - Joe Bacuzzi, English association football player, defense for Fulham from 1935 to 1956, and England national football team during World War II; as Giuseppe Luigi David Bacuzzi, in Clerkenwell, London, England (d. 1995)
  - Jim Benton, American football player, wide receiver for the Cleveland Rams, Chicago Bears and Los Angeles Rams from 1938 to 1947; as James Warren Benton, in Carthage, Arkansas, United States (d. 2001)
  - Bobby Bonales, Mexican wrestler, title holder of the NWA World Welterweight Championship, Mexican National Middleweight Championship, and Mexican National Lightweight Championship; as Roberto Aceves, in Morelia, Mexico (d. 1994)
  - Deendayal Upadhyaya, Indian philosopher, prominent leader with the Bharatiya Jana Sangh movement; in Nagla Chandraban, United Provinces of Agra and Oudh, British India (present-day Deendayal Dham, Uttar Pradesh, India) (d. 1968)
- Died:
  - George Capell, 58, British noble, 7th Earl of Essex; died after being run over by a taxi (b. 1857)
  - Edwin Welch, 77, British journalist, located John King, sole survivor of the Burke and Wills expedition in Australia (b. 1838)
  - Arthur Herbert Thompson, 26, English soldier, amateur association football player; died during the Capture of Gueudecourt (b. 1890)

== September 26, 1916 (Tuesday) ==
- Battle of Morval – British forces captured the French villages of Combles and Gueudecourt from the Germans.
- Battle of Thiepval Ridge – British forces assaulted Thiepval, France, to capture the Schwaben Redoubt while German defenses were divided between it and the Battle of Morval.
- Battle of Kaymakchalan – With Bulgarian forces now pushed to the town of Mariovo in Macedonia, the battle shifted to control of the Serbian Prophet Ilia peak of the Kajmakčalan mountain that lasted a further four days.
- Battle of Transylvania – The Central Powers launched a counteroffensive starting with the recapture of city of Sibiu, Transylvania.
- The Imperial German Army established the 9th Bavarian Reserve Division and was active until disbanding in 1918.
- C. R. W. Nevinson, a war artist serving with the British Army, opened his first major single-artist exhibition in London.
- Born:
  - Julius B. Richmond, American physician and heath administrator, 12th Surgeon General of the United States; as Julius Benjamin Richmond, in Chicago, United States (d. 2008)
  - Denis Spotswood, British air force officer, Chief of the Air Staff from 1971 to 1974; in Lewisham, London, England (d. 2001)

== September 27, 1916 (Wednesday) ==
- Battle of Thiepval Ridge – Joint British and Canadian forces launched an attack to capture the Stuff Redoubt that it failed to gain during the opening day of the Battle of the Somme, resulting in the recapture of Moquet Farm.
- Lij Iyasu of Ethiopia was deposed in a palace coup, in favor of his aunt Zewditu.
- German submarine SM UB-7 departed from the Bulgarian port of Varna for operations in the Black Sea where it disappeared from communication afterwards with all 15 crew missing.
- Born:
  - Trento Longaretti, Italian painter, director of the Accademia Carrara from 1953 to 1978; in Treviglio, Kingdom of Italy (present-day Italy) (d. 2017)
  - Vittorio Mussolini, Italian film producer, second son of Benito Mussolini; in Milan, Kingdom of Italy (present-day Italy) (d. 1997)
  - Samuel S. Stratton, American politician, U.S. Representative from New York from 1959 to 1989; as Samuel Studdiford Stratton, in Yonkers, New York, United States (d. 1990)
- Died: Charles E. Vreeland, 64, American naval officer, Rear Admiral of the United States Navy from 1911 to 1914 (b. 1852)

== September 28, 1916 (Thursday) ==
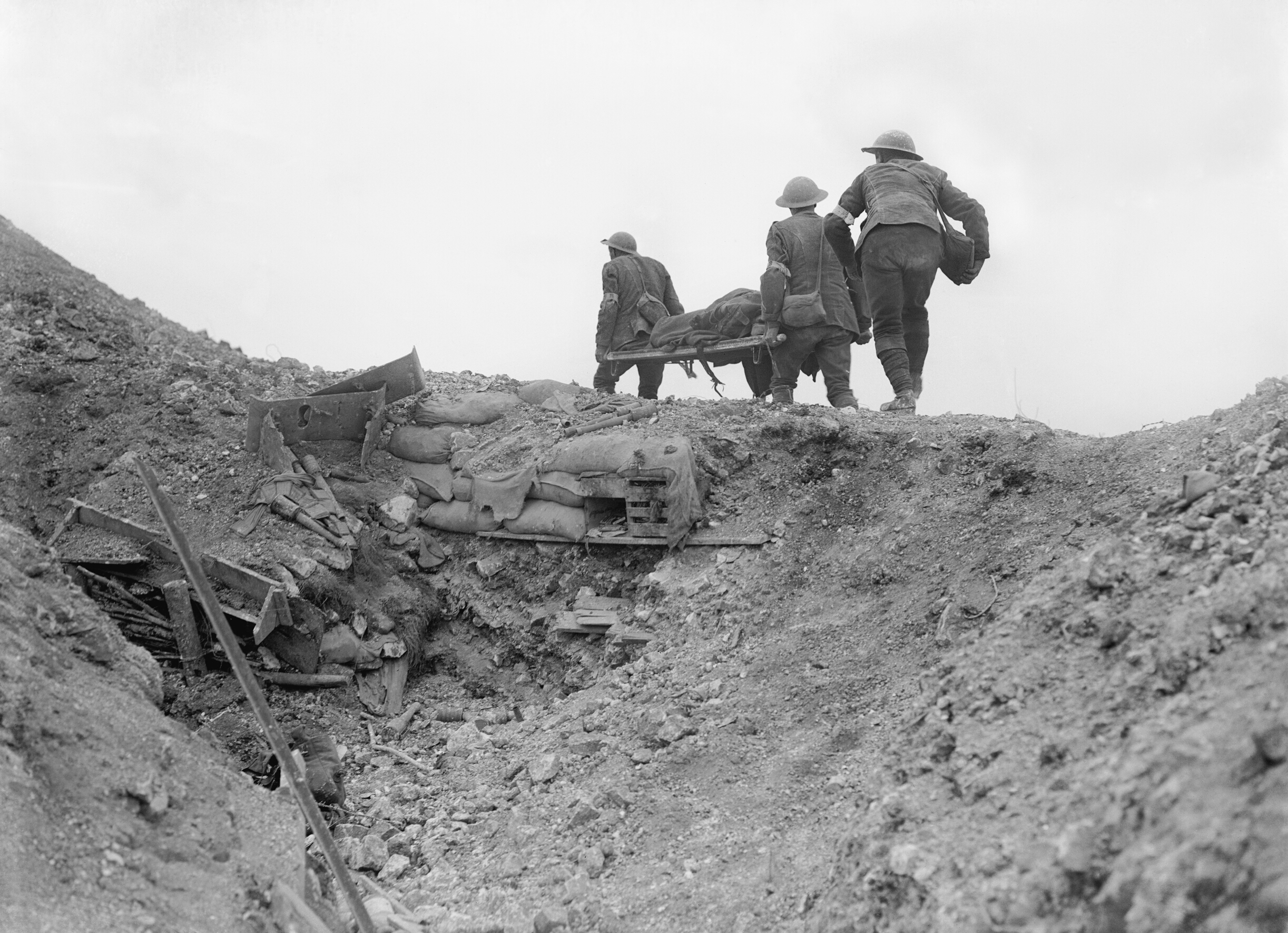
Stretcher bearers during the Battle of Thiepval Ridge, September 1916

- Battle of Morval – Major actions during the battle ended with Anglo-French forces sustained far fewer casualties than the Germans, with 5,000 recorded for the Allies. German casualties for Allied assaults since July were at 135,000.
- Battle of Thiepval Ridge – British forces captured the south side of Schwaben Redoubt, a key German defensive landmark on the Ancre River in France. British casualties were 12,500 while Germans were shared with the estimated 135,000 recorded for the end of September, with 2,329 taken prisoner during the attack on Thiepval, France.
- The German air squadrons Jagdstaffel 9, 10, 11, 12, 14 and 15 were established in the Imperial German Flying Corps. The aggressive tactics of the 9th squadron during World War I became the model for the Luftwaffe in World War II. The 11th squadron gained notoriety in the following year when Manfred von Richthofen, better known as The Red Baron, became its squadron leader.
- Born:
  - Peter Finch, British-Australian actor, recipient of the Academy Award for Best Actor for Network; as Frederick George Peter Ingle Finch, in London, England (d. 1977)
  - Arthur Cockfield, British noble and politician, served as Secretary of State for Trade from 1982 to 1983; as Francis Arthur Cockfield, in Horsham, England (d. 2007)
  - Olga Lepeshinskaya, Ukrainian ballet dancer, prima ballerina for Bolshoi Ballet, recipient People's Artist of the USSR; in Kiev, Russian Empire (present-day Kyiv, Ukraine) (d. 2008)
  - Stanley Orr, British fighter pilot, highest-scoring fighter ace for the Royal Navy during World War II with 17 confirmed kills, recipient of the Distinguished Service Cross; in London, England (d. 2003)

== September 29, 1916 (Friday) ==
- Flămânda Offensive – The Romanian Second Army was ordered to concentrate on attacking German forces under command of August von Mackensen near Oltenița, Romania.
- Born: Carl Giles, English cartoonist, best known for his cartoon work with the British tabloid Daily Express; as Ronald Giles, in London, England (d. 1995)

== September 30, 1916 (Saturday) ==
- Arab Revolt – The revolt against the Ottoman Empire proved very successful after four months of fighting thanks to support of the Royal Navy, including the capture of coastal ports of Rabigh, Yanbu, and Qunfida with 6,000 Ottoman prisoners of war.
- Battle of Kaymakchalan – Serbian forces took final control of the Prophet Ilia peak of the Kajmakčalan mountain in Macedonia, ending the battle at enormous cost. Serbia had 4,643 killed and approximately 6,000 wounded while Bulgaria had 1,927 killed and 6,067 wounded.
- Romanian campaign – German submarine SM UB-42 fired on Romanian torpedo boat Smeul but missed, allowing the warship to counterattack and damage the submarine.
- Construction on the Hell Gate Bridge in New York City was completed.
- Born: Richard K. Guy, British mathematician and author, leading researcher on numbers theory, co-author of Winning Ways for Your Mathematical Plays and Unsolved Problems in Number Theory; as Richard Kenneth Guy, in Nuneaton, England (d. 2020)
