= Turbid (disambiguation) =

Turbid may refer to:

- Turbidity, cloudiness in a liquid
- Turbid Creek (Alaska), a stream in Alaska, US
- Turbid Creek (British Columbia), a stream in British Columbia, Canada
- Turbid Lake, a lake in Wyoming
- Turbid Lake (Minnesota), a lake in Minnesota

== See also ==
- Turbidity current
- Turbidite, a type of rock
