= Turbid Creek =

Turbid Creek may refer to:

- Turbid Creek (Alaska)
- Turbid Creek (British Columbia)
