= Garnet Driver =

South African cricketer and South African Army officer

Personal information
- Full name: Garnet Edwin Driver
- Born: 26 May 1883; Pietermaritzburg, Natal, South Africa
- Died: 7 September 1916 (aged 33); Kisaki, German East Africa

Domestic team information
- Years: Team
- 1903/04: Griqualand West

Career statistics
Competition	First-class
Matches	1
Runs scored	99
Batting average	49.50
100s/50s	0/1
Top score	62
Catches/stumpings	1/–
- Source: CricInfo, 31 March 2021

Garnet Edwin Driver (26 May 1883 – 7 September 1916) was a South African first-class cricketer, solicitor, and South African Army officer.

The son of Edwin James Driver, he was born at Pietermaritzburg in May 1883. He was educated at both Hilton College and Maritzburg College. After completing his education, he became a solicitor and a conveyancer. Driver was an all-round sportsman, playing rugby union for Wasps and club cricket for Standard Cricket Club. He played a single first-class cricket match for Griqualand West against Western Province at Kimberley in 1903 in the Currie Cup. He performed well in the match, being dismissed for scores of 37 and 62 by Charles Bain and Bonnor Middleton respectively, but did not feature again in first-class cricket.

Driver served in the First World War with the South African Army, being commissioned into the 8th South African Horse in November 1914. He was later promoted to the temporary rank of lieutenant in May 1916, with seniority antedated to November 1914. On 22 May 1916, he embarked for German East Africa. He was seriously wounded in action and captured during the Battle of Kisaki on 7 September 1916, dying from his wounds on the same day. He was posthumously mentioned in dispatches for 'meritorious service in the field in East Africa'. He was buried at the Morogoro Cemetery. Driver was survived by his wife Ruby Adelaide Driver, with whom he had a daughter.
