= Two-door =

Two-door or "two doors", etc. may refer to:

- Coupé, an automobile with two doors
- Hatchback or "two door hatchback", a two-door car with a third rear door accessing a cargo area
- Two Doors, a 2012 South Korean documentary film

== See also ==
- My House Has Two Doors, a 1980 book, one of a multi-book autobiography by Han Suyin of Hong Kong
- Two door bathroom or "Jack and Jill bathroom", a bathroom with two doors, usually accessible from two bedrooms
- Two Door Cinema Club, a Northern Irish indie rock band formed in 2007
- "Two Doors Down", a 1978 country/pop song written and performed by American singer Dolly Parton
- "Two Doors Down (Mystery Jets song)", a 2008 song by the Mystery Jets, an English indie rock band
