= Man's Fate (film) =

- Directed by: Fred Zinnemann
- Written by: Han Suyin
- Based on: the novel Man's Fate by Andre Malraux
- Starring: David Niven; Peter Finch; Liv Ullmann; Max von Sydow
- Production company: MGM
- Release date: 1970 (intended)
- Country: United States
- Language: English

Man's Fate was an abandoned 1969 film adaptation of the novel Man's Fate by Andre Malraux to have been directed by Fred Zinnemann and produced by Metro-Goldwyn-Mayer (MGM).

== Pre-production ==
Following the critical and commercial success of his 1966 film A Man for All Seasons, which won the Academy Award for Best Picture and earned Zinnemann the Best Director Oscar, the filmmaker announced plans to create a film version of André Malraux's Man's Fate (La Condition Humaine), a 1933 novel about the failed 1927 Communist revolution that took place in Shanghai, China, and the existential quandaries facing a group of people whose lives were changed by the event.

"I had an enormous, enormous need to do Man's Fate because that book was a bible to us in my generation," said Zinnemann in a late-life interview. "It was one of the great novels of the '30s and '40s and to be asked to make a film of it was one of the greatest events of my life."

MGM agreed to produce the film. Zinnemann began his career as a feature film director at that studio with the thriller The Seventh Cross (1944).

The screenplay for the film adaptation was created by the Chinese-born novelist Han Suyin, best known for her 1952 book A Many-Splendoured Thing. Zinnemann scouted out locations in Malaysia and Singapore, with interior scenes to be shot at the MGM studios in London, where sets and costumes were created. David Niven, Peter Finch and Liv Ullmann were signed as the stars of the film.

== Cancellation ==
The pre-production process for Man's Fate stretched three years before it reached the production stage. During this period, MGM began to experience severe financial problems. James T. Aubrey, a former production chief for the CBS television network, was hired in 1969 as the studio's new president. One of his earliest decisions was to cancel all planned films that did not show signs of commercial viability. Zinnemann's $US 3 million version of Man's Fate was one of 12 films that Aubrey halted. The production of Man's Fate was canceled one week before filming was to begin. (The others included a big screen version of Tai-Pan by James Clavell.)

Zinnemann would later state that his cast and crew continued working without salaries in the period between the news of the cancellation being made public and the scheduled start of filming on November 24, 1969. "I soon found that no one in the unit wanted to stop rehearsing, salary or no salary," he later recalled. "We worked for three more days until the script was fully rehearsed, scene by scene. Then, after the usual farewell party as if on the set of a real picture, everybody went home."

== Aftermath ==
Zinnemann later sued MGM for damages relating to the cancellation, with the case being settled in his favour in 1973.

The Italian director Bernardo Bertolucci proposed adapting the film in the 1980s to the Chinese government; they preferred his alternative proposal, The Last Emperor, a 1987 biopic based around the life of the Chinese Emperor Puyi.

In 2001, U.S. filmmaker Michael Cimino announced he would write and direct a film version of Man's Fate, with Daniel Day-Lewis, John Malkovich, Uma Thurman and Johnny Depp in the lead roles. The project fell through for lack of funding; Cimino, who died in 2016, never made another feature film.
