= My House Has Two Doors =

1980 book by Han Suyin

- First edition
- Author: Han Suyin
- Language: English
- Genre: Autobiography, history
- Publisher: Jonathan Cape
- Publication date: 1980
- Publication place: United Kingdom
- Media type: Print (book)
- Pages: 655
- ISBN: 0-224-01702-0
- OCLC: 6399522
- Dewey Decimal: 823/.912 B 19
- LC Class: PR6015.A4674 Z475 1980b
- Preceded by: Birdless Summer
- Followed by: Wind In My Sleeve

My House Has Two Doors (1980) is one of a multi-book autobiography by Han Suyin. It tells of her life from 1948 to 1980, including the real-life love-affair that was the basis for her 1952 novel A Many-Splendoured Thing. She went from Hong Kong to Malaya, where she witnessed the Communist insurgency she described in her 1956 novel And the Rain My Drink. She also tells of her return to China and her impression of the early years of Communist rule.

The second half of the book is sometimes published as a separate work entitled Phoenix Harvest.
