= The Mountain Is Young =

Novel by Han Suyin

- First edition
- Author: Han Suyin
- Cover artist: Pat Marriott
- Language: English
- Genre: novel
- Set in: Nepal, 1956
- Publisher: Jonathan Cape
- Publication date: 1958
- Publication place: United Kingdom
- Media type: Print (book)
- Pages: 440
- Dewey Decimal: 823.914
- LC Class: PZ4.H233 PR6015 .A4674

The Mountain Is Young is the fourth novel by Chinese-Flemish author Han Suyin. A love story set in Nepal, it was first published by Jonathan Cape, Ltd. London in 1958. It became a New York Times bestseller in Fiction that same year. It was republished by Penguin Books in 1962, by HarperCollins in 1987 and by Rupa & Co. in 1999.

== Origins ==
The novel is based on Han Suyin's experiences as an invited attendee of the 1956 coronation of the King of Nepal, an event which is described in the novel. In the preface, Han Suyin writes that the book, while being a work of fiction, endeavors to give as exact a picture as is possible of the time. The school at which Anne Ford teaches, many other institutions and places referenced in the book, and of all the named characters, are invented.

The Mountain is Young is written in the confessional style and is considered to reflect autobiographical details of the author's personal life, specifically the difficult ending of her second marriage with British officer Leonard Comber, and meeting the Indian army colonel, Vincent Ruthnaswamy, who would become her third husband.

== Plot summary ==
The Mountain Is Young is set in Nepal in 1956. The protagonist, Anne Ford, is a writer whose husband is a retired colonial civil servant. She travels to Kathmandu after securing a job as an English teacher at a girls' institute. There, she meets and falls in love with the engineer responsible for building the dam.

It is a story of rediscovering yourself after a long sleep of fitting in, boredom and misery. The reader of this story is inspired to discover the same self, become aware of the unseen rules of society and challenge the fact that they threaten to take away the joy of using our gifts and live our unique lives to the fullest, just as happens to lead character Anne when she awakens.

== Reception ==
The book was described in The Rough Guide to Nepal 2002 as "the first—and still only—bestseller in English set in Nepal". The Rough Guide says it shows how much has changed in Kathmandu 56 years later, and "somewhat surprisingly" how much has not changed since then.

In Forster and further: the tradition of Anglo-Indian fiction, Sujit Mukherjee writes "The novel appears to be a command performance because Han Suyin was specially invited to attend the coronation of King Mahendra and Queen Ratna in May 1956. This work, a direct outcome of that experience, is nearly as fabulous as the occasion it celebrates. The central fable combines resuscitation of a writer along with reawakening as a woman."
