= Asiaweek =

Hong Kong news magazine

- cover August 25, 1993
- Frequency: Weekly
- Founded: 1975
- Final issue: December 2001
- Company: Time Inc.
- Based in: Hong Kong
- Language: English
- ISSN: 1012-6244

Asiaweek was an English-language news magazine focusing on Asia, published weekly by Asiaweek Limited, a subsidiary of Time Inc. Based in Hong Kong, it was established in 1975, and ceased publication with its 7 December 2001 issue due to a "downturn in the advertising market", according to Norman Pearlstine, editor in chief of Time Inc. The magazine had a circulation of 120,000 copies when it closed.

The magazine was formerly associated with Yazhou Zhoukan (亞洲週刊), an international Chinese newsweekly, before Time Warner media acquired it.

== History ==
Asiaweek was founded in 1975 by Michael O'Neill, a New Zealander, and T. J. S. George, an Indian, who had worked together at the Far Eastern Economic Review but had grown disenchanted with what they considered its ponderous style and perceived British stance. Asiaweek's mission statement said it all: "To report accurately and fairly the affairs of Asia in all spheres of human activity, to see the world from an Asian perspective, to be Asia's voice in the world."

Among the publication's many contributions to an understanding of the Asia-Pacific Rim region was the annual Asiaweek Short Story Competition, which ran from 1981 to 1988. Prizewinning Asian Fiction (edited and introduced by Leon Comber) was eventually published in book form in 1991 by Times Editions, Singapore, and Hong Kong University Press In his foreword, Asiaweek Managing Editor Salmon Wayne Morrison wrote: "The competition cast a body of writing that had not been given publicity before."

Asiaweek had only four editors during its 26 years period: co-founders T. J. S. George and Michael O'Neill, who conceived the magazine, Ann Morrison who succeeded O'Neill in 1994, and Dorinda Elliott, formerly Newsweek's Asia editor in Hong Kong, who took over in October 2000. The magazine had always moved with the times. As co-founder George wrote in an editorial statement in Asiaweek's first issue in December 1975: "Realities have changed, and so the values. It is now a new Asia, and this is a new magazine to report it."

O'Neill was a founding Editor-in-Chief of Yazhou Zhoukan, which was launched by Asiaweek Limited in 1987, with Thomas Hon Wing Polin as its founding Managing Editor.

In 1985, Time, Inc. (as it was then known) acquired 84% of Asiaweek, buying out Reader's Digest's 80% stake and 4% local interests. The remaining 16% was owned by Michael O'Neill.

In 1994, Time ousted O'Neill and installed another editor, Ann Morrison, who came to Hong Kong from Fortune (a Time publication) based in New York.

== Closure ==
George, who left Asiaweek before its troubles began, laments the death of the magazine after O'Neill was removed. With Asiaweek's demise, George said, his only regret was the way "the magazine was devalued by the very people who took it upon themselves to nurture it. That is why I shed no tears now as the concept itself was killed in 1994 when Mike was removed by the new management. Its closure [in 2001] is a mere burial."

According to Time, the reason for the closure was due to an advertising slump. Executives at Time insist their decisions were based on economic, not editorial, considerations.

The New York Times columnist Thomas Crampton writes, "Asiaweek and the Far Eastern Economic Review were the only weekly magazines with a strong Asia focus through the 1980s. But competition grew in the 1990s when global and local media companies expanded into regional editions. In addition to several small regionally financed magazines, The Economist, Fortune, BusinessWeek and Forbes all began aggressive expansions into Asia. These global titles could rely on skeletal staffs and economies of scale."

According to Crampton, besides the "brutal competition for limited advertising revenue", another plausible reason for the shakeout was "the suffocating embrace of U.S.-based media giants with an American-centric perspective." For Asiaweek's founding editor, Time Warner's closure of the 26-year-old publication plays into Asian fears of a U.S.-centric world media. "The mandarins of Manhattan fully know Asia's potential," said T. J. S. George, who is now an editorial consultant for the New Indian Express Group. "They want a total monopoly for Time magazine."

== American involvement ==
'Asia through Asian eyes' was the slogan that helped Asiaweek rise. Writing in 2009, George was still nostalgic about the fresh and fearless style of the magazine during its heyday and is wary of American meddling in Asian affairs. He warned that "perhaps the most deep-going, subliminal – if also pernicious – mind control weapon at America's disposal is its news media."

But Singapore-based Alejandro Reyes, long-time correspondent and contributing editor of Asiaweek, insisted that the magazine retained its strongly Asian voice independent of whatever the bosses in New York might have wanted. He says the magazine's demise was due to the "failure of a pan-Asian marketing strategy impeded by limited resources and intense competition" and is hopeful of the revival of a niche market for media with an Asian perspective despite globalization trends.

Reyes, who was educated in the United States, initially applauded the modern, business-oriented techniques and practices of AOL Time Warner. He was not too happy when he found out that Time deleted all Asiaweek articles from its online archives, including his. "This is all very tragic," says Reyes, "– misguided decisions by New York-centric media bureaucrats whose careers are probably soon to be deleted just as ruthlessly."

M.G.G. Pillai, one of Asiaweek's casualties, said the magazine lost focus and became increasingly Americanised after Time took over. Unlike Reyes, he was not optimistic that it would be replaced because most magazines in Asia depend on the patronage of political rulers, and most financiers have an axe to grind.

Philip Bowring, former editor of the Far Eastern Economic Review, which was bought by Dow Jones in the late 1980s, merged with the Asian Wall Street Journal in 2001 and was quartered into a monthly in 2004 before its final burial in 2009, said in 2004 when the Review died as a weekly that "there is a parallel here between Time and Asiaweek. Time bought locally born Asiaweek even though it appeared to be in direct competition for readers and advertising. So not long afterwards, Time closed Asiaweek rather than its ailing Time Asia."

T. J. S. George said, "In due course, Time Inc. killed Asiaweek and Dow Jones (now a Murdoch property) killed the Review. Murdoch-Dow's Wall Street Journal and Time Inc.'s Time magazine now fly the American flag over Asia, unchallenged by lesser flags."
