= Leon Comber =

British military officer and book publisher (1921–2023)

Leonard Francis Comber (20 September 1921 – 11 May 2023) was a British military and police officer, and later book publisher, operating in British India, Malaya, Singapore, Hong Kong and Australia. He was also an editor and author of books relating to South-East Asia.

== Early life ==
Leonard Francis Comber, an only child, was born in London on 20 September 1921. His mother was married to a master bookbinder and typesetter. He was reading law at King's College, London, in 1939 when the Second World War began.

== World War II ==
During World War Two, Comber served as an officer in the Indian Army and took part in military operations in Assam and Burma. At the end of the war, he was among those who landed at Morib Beach, Selangor, on the west coast of Malaya, and witnessed the surrender of Japanese forces in Kelantan.

== Malaya ==
Following service with the British Military Administration of Malaya (BMA), he was appointed to the British Colonial Service (Malayan Police) when the army handed over administration of the country to the civilian government in April 1946. Leon Comber, a Chinese speaker, spent most of his police service with the Special Branch, the organisation responsible for political, security and operational intelligence. Special Branch participated in the Malayan Emergency (1948-1960), when counter-insurgency operations were launched against the Communist Party of Malaya (CPM) and its guerrilla force, the MNLA (Malayan National Liberation Army).

Comber left Special Branch after his wife, author Han Suyin, whom he married in 1952, wrote a novel, And the Rain My Drink (1956), which was viewed as being anti-British in its depiction of the guerrilla war of Chinese rubber workers against the government. They divorced in 1958.

Comber then worked for more than twenty years in book publishing. First based in Singapore, later in Hong Kong, he was the regional representative of Heinemann Educational Books of London. He became managing director of local Heinemann subsidiary companies established in Hong Kong, Singapore and Kuala Lumpur. In 1966 he founded Heinemann Educational Books (Asia) Ltd's Writing in Asia Series which were accompanied by his Asian Studies Series and his Favourite Stories Series with the same publisher. Subsequently, he was Publisher and Director of Hong Kong University Press.

Comber was the Hong Kong judge of the Asiaweek Short Story Competition, which was run annually between 1981 and 1988. He edited and wrote an introduction for Prizewinning Asian Fiction, an anthology of prizewinning short stories from the competition. Throughout this period, he also wrote and edited a large number of books and articles, including several about Malayan policing and intelligence.

In 1991, he moved to Melbourne, Australia, with his second wife, Takako Kawai, and their daughter. Subsequently, he became an Honorary Research Fellow at Monash Asia Institute, Monash University. At the age of 76, he was awarded a Ph.D. in Asian Studies.

Comber was a senior fellow at the Institute of South East Asian Studies, Singapore, from 2011 to 2020.

Comber died in Melbourne, Australia on 11 May 2023, at the age of 101.

== Selected publications ==
=== Books ===
- Chinese Ancestor Worship in Malaya (1954).
- Chinese Temples in Singapore (1958).
- Chinese Secret Societies in Malaya: A Survey of the Triad Society from 1800 to 1900 (1959).
- Favourite Chinese Stories (1967; 1975; 1988) - variant title: Favourite Stories for Chinese Schools
- The Strange Cases of Magistrate Pao: Chinese Tales of Crime and Detection. Translated from the Chinese and Retold by Leon Comber [with] Illustrations by Lo Koon-chiu (1970; 1972; 2010).
- The Golden Treasure Box: Favourite Stories From the Orient (1979).
- Malaya's Secret Police 1945-1960: The Role of the Special Branch in the Malayan Emergency (2008).
- 13 May 1969: The Darkest Day in Malaysian History (2009).
- The Triads: Chinese Secret Societies in 1950s Malaya and Singapore (2009).
- Through the Bamboo Window: Chinese Life and Culture in 1950s Malaya and Singapore (2009).
- Singapore Correspondent: Political Dispatches from Singapore, 1958-1962 (2012).
- Templer and the Road to Malaysian Independence: The Man and His Time (2015).
- Dalley and the Malayan Security Service, 1945-48: MI5 vs. MSS (2018).

=== Articles ===
- "The Origins of the Cold War in Southeast Asia: The Case of the Communist Party of Malaysia (1948–1960): A Special Branch Perspective", in: Kajian Malaysia, vol. 27, nos. 1 and 2 January 2009), pp. 39-60.
- "Publishing Asian Writers in English", in: Mimi Chan and Roy Harris, Asian Voices in English, Hong Kong University Press, 1991, pp. 79-86.

=== Book series ===
- Asian Studies Series (Heinemann Asia)
- Favourite Stories Series (Heinemann Asia)
- Writing in Asia Series (Heinemann Asia)
