= Birdless Summer =

1968 autobiography by Han Suyin

- First edition (UK)
- Author: Han Suyin
- Language: English
- Genre: autobiography, history
- Published: 1968 (Jonathan Cape) (UK); 1968 (Putnam) (US)
- Publication place: United Kingdom
- Media type: Print (book)
- Pages: 347
- Preceded by: A Mortal Flower
- Followed by: My House Has Two Doors

Birdless Summer is a 1968 autobiography by Chinese-Belgian-British physician and author Han Suyin. It covers the years 1938 to 1948, her work as a midwife in Chengtu and then going to London with her husband, who was a military attaché there. Also, her training as a doctor, the start of the last phase of the Chinese Civil War, in which her husband died fighting for the Kuomintang.

She gives a vivid picture of the final years of Kuomintang rule in mainland China, and of reactions to the Japanese invasion. She also tells how she came to write her first book, Destination Chungking.
