= A Mortal Flower =

Book by Han Suyin

- First edition (UK)
- Author: Han Suyin
- Language: English
- Genre: autobiography, history
- Publisher: Jonathan Cape (UK); Putnam (US)
- Publication date: 1966
- Publication place: United Kingdom
- Media type: Print (book)
- Pages: 412 pp
- LC Class: PR6015.A4674 M6 1966a
- Preceded by: The Crippled Tree
- Followed by: Birdless Summer

A Mortal Flower is an autobiography by Han Suyin. It covers the years 1928 to 1938: her growing up in China and her journey to Belgium and her mother's family. Also her marriage to a rising officer in the Kuomintang and the retreat to Chungking in the face of the Japanese invasion of China.
