= Abbas Guliyev =

Soviet Azerbaijani army captain (1916–1998)

Abbas Shahbaz oglu Guliyev
- Abbas Şahbaz oğlu Quliyev
- Born: September 15, 1916; Şəkərabad, Babek District, Nakhichevan ASSR, Azerbaijan
- Died: December 30, 1998 (aged 82); Nakhchivan, Azerbaijan
- Military career
- Allegiance: Soviet Union
- Branch: Red Army
- Service years: 1941–1945
- Rank: Captain
- Unit: 5th Artillery Division
- Conflicts: World War II; Operation Kutuzov; Battle of the Dnieper; Operation Bagration; Lublin-Brest Offensive; Vistula-Oder Offensive
- Awards: Hero of the Soviet Union; Order of Lenin; Order of the Red Banner; Order of Alexander Nevsky; Order of the Patriotic War, 1st class (2); Order of the Red Banner of Labour

Abbas Shahbaz oglu Guliyev (Azerbaijani: Abbas Şahbaz oğlu Quliyev; 15 September 1916 – 30 December 1998) was an Azerbaijani Red Army captain and Hero of the Soviet Union. Guliyev was awarded the title on 21 February 1945 for his leadership of his battery during the Lublin–Brest offensive. Guliyev's battery reportedly helped repulse counterattacks in the Puławy bridgehead. Postwar, Guliyev was discharged from the army. He was deputy Minister of Education of the Nakhchivan Autonomous Republic and secretary of the Presidium of the Supreme Soviet of the republic.

== Early life ==
Guliyev was born on 15 September 1916 in Şəkərabad to a peasant family. He graduated from the Baku Pedagogical College in 1936. Guliyev later graduated from the Azerbaijani Theatre Institute. He worked as an actor at the Nakhchivan Drama Theatre.

== World War II ==
Guliyev was drafted into the Red Army in June 1941. He fought in combat from August 1941. He fought on the Western Front and then the Southwestern Front from August to September. Guliyev was slightly wounded on 10 August. He fought on the Bryansk Front from January to February 1942 and was slightly wounded on 6 February. After recovering he was sent to the Sumy Artillery School, which had been evacuated to Achinsk, from which he graduated in July 1943. He became a platoon commander in the 768th Light Artillery Regiment of the 16th Light Artillery Brigade in the 5th Artillery Division. Guliyev fought in Operation Kutuzov. On 10 August the regiment became the 279th Guards Light Artillery Regiment and the brigade became the 23rd Guards Light Artillery Brigade for its actions at Ponyri station during the Battle of Kursk.

Guliyev fought in the Chernigov-Pripyat Offensive, part of the Battle of the Dnieper. During the offensive, he crossed the Desna and the Sozh, fighting in the capture of Sevsk. On 16 October Guliyev crossed the Dnieper to the Loyew bridgehead and supported infantry attacks to expand the bridgehead. On 21 October he supported advancing infantry on Height 111.5 in Derazhichi. On that day, the battery reportedly destroyed two machine guns, five carts, suppressed the fire of five machine guns, and reportedly killed up to 30 German soldiers and dispersed two platoons of infantry. The battery reportedly help repulse a counterattack at Sevki, killing up to 40 German soldiers. For his actions Guliyev was recommended for the Order of the Red Banner and instead received the Order of the Patriotic War 1st class on 30 November.

Between 10 and 30 November Guliyev fought in the Gomel-Rechitsa Offensive, during which Rechytsa was captured on 18 November. At the end of November the line of the Berezina had been reached. Between 8 and 30 January he fought in the Kalinkovichi-Mozyr Offensive. In 1944 he became a Communist Party of the Soviet Union member.

During the summer of 1944 Guliyev fought in Operation Bagration and the Lublin–Brest Offensive. He became commander of the 4th Battery of the regiment. On 18 July during the breakthrough in Matseyuv, the 4th Battery reportedly suppressed a German battery and destroyed two machine guns, enabling the advance of the infantry. Guliyev fought in the capture of Liuboml on 19 July. On 20 July the battery crossed the Western Bug and supported a battalion of the 170th Rifle Regiment, reportedly repulsing two counterattacks with direct fire. The battery reportedly destroyed two heavy machine guns, an anti-tank gun, and killed a German infantry platoon. On 21 July, during the battle for Rudka village on the west bank of the Western Bug, Guliyev's battery, supporting the 7th Company of the 172nd Guards Rifle Regiment of the 57th Guards Rifle Division, reportedly suppressed the fire of a machine gun, and dispersed a platoon of German infantry on the eastern outskirts of the village, allowing the infantry to capture the village without heavy casualties. During the pursuit the battery was reported to have destroyed three machine guns and suppressed a mortar battery and two machine guns. On 24 July the battery participated in the capture of Lublin. He was recommended for the Order of the Red Banner. On 8 August, Guliyev was instead awarded the Order of Alexander Nevsky for his actions at Matsuyev and Rudka.

On 2 August, he crossed the Vistula with his battery near the village of Zastuv Korchmiski 18 kilometers south of Puławy. The battery provided support to the 2nd Battalion of the 916th Rifle Regiment during the capture of the heights. On the night of 3 August and the morning of 4 August German troops launched a counterattack, which caught Guliyev's battery in an exposed position. The 4th Battery reportedly repulsed the counterattack at close range, inflicting heavy losses. In the battles to hold the bridgehead, the battery reportedly helped repulse fifteen counterattacks. The battery reportedly destroyed a 75mm gun battery, a mortar, and two heavy machine guns. They also reportedly dispersed a company of German soldiers. During these battles the battery reportedly suffered casualties of two wounded. On 17 August Guliyev was slightly wounded.

In early 1945, Guliyev fought in the Warsaw-Poznan offensive of the Vistula–Oder offensive. During the pre-attack barrage during the attack on the defenses at Shylakhatski Lyas the battery reportedly destroyed two anti-tank guns and four machine guns. On 14 January, supporting a battalion of the 383rd Rifle Division's 694th Rifle Regiment, battery fire reportedly suppressed German firing points, enabling the advance. The battery reportedly destroyed two anti-tank guns, suppressed a mortar battery, and dispersed a German infantry company. Between 15 and 20 January, supporting the 1st Battalion of the 1210th Rifle Regiment of the 362nd Rifle Division. On 16 January 30 German soldiers were reportedly captured in the forest northeast of Bzhnovitse. On 21 February 1945, Guliyev was awarded the title Hero of the Soviet Union and the Order of Lenin for his leadership. On 29 March, he was awarded the Order of the Red Banner for his actions on 14 and 16 January.

== Postwar ==
After the end of the war, Guliyev was discharged from the army. He worked as deputy Minister of Education of the Nakhchivan Autonomous Republic. He was later Secretary of the Presidium of the Supreme Soviet of the republic. In 1953, he graduated from the Higher Party School of the Azerbaijan Communist Party. He worked as chairman of the Nakhchivan City Council and department head of the Babak District Executive Committee. Guliyev lived in Nakhichevan. On 6 November 1985, he was awarded a second Order of the Patriotic War 1st class on the 40th anniversary of the end of the war. He died on 30 December 1998.
