= Battle of Kisaki =

World War I military action

- Part of World War I
Date	7–11 September 1916
Location	Kisaki, German East Africa 7°29′10″S 37°36′05″E
Result	German victory

Belligerents
German Empire: German East Africa	South Africa

Commanders and leaders
(German Empire) Paul von Lettow-Vorbeck	(Union of South Africa) Jan Smuts: Coen Brits

Strength
2,200	1,700
- Location within Tanzania Battle of Kisaki (Africa)

The Battle of Kisaki was a confrontation between German and South Africa forces near the town of Kisaki, German East Africa, on 7–11 September 1916.

== Background ==
Paul Emil von Lettow-Vorbeck was appointed the military commander of the German colonial forces known as the Schutztruppe protection force in German East Africa on 13 April 1914. When World War I broke out in August 1914, he ignored orders from Berlin and his governor, and seized the initiative to attack the British city of Taveta. After repulsing General Aitken's attack on Tanga and Longido in November 1914, he gathered his forces and supplies and moved to harass the British rail communications in East Africa, helping the German war effort by tying down as much British troops possible in East Africa.

Lettow-Vorbeck eventually managed to gather a force of about 12,000 soldiers, most of them native Askari, led by a highly motivated officer corps of both German and Askari descent.

In 1916, Lettow-Vorbeck had managed to successfully harass the British Central Railway to Uganda without being forced in an engagement, which he would certainly lose being hopelessly outnumbered. After leaving Dar es Salaam to the British, he withdrew to a position in the easily defended Uluguru Mountains. Lettow-Vorbeck was planning to make a stand there, allowing his supplies to move south before going there with the main force himself.

General Jan Smuts, detached the 3rd Infantry Division, led by Coen Brits and the 1st Mounted Brigade, led by Nussey from the main South African force on the Central Railway and had planned that the mounted division would be available to flank the German forces while the 3rd Infantry division engaged the enemy, but he failed to take the rugged terrain into consideration.

== The battle ==
The German Schutztruppen prepared defensive positions outside the town of Kisaki. 200 troops were stationed around the town, 1,000 were kept as a mobile reserve to the west while another 1,000 were kept in reserve on the other side of a mountain.

On 7 September 1916, the 3rd Infantry Division conducted a frontal assault on the defensive positions of the Schutztruppen. German Field Artillery and 4.1 inch (100 mm) guns, salvaged from the SMS Koenigsberg, blasted the South African formations.

The 1st Mounted Brigade attempted to maneuver around the flank and prepared to assault on the German positions. However, the treacherous terrain, and loss of the radio linking them to 3rd Infantry Division, caused them to arrive on 8 September. Lettow-Vorbecks reserve was positioned in a good position to strike the cavalry with guns and rifles and the South Africans were routed.

Smuts called off the attack on 11 September and withdrew his forces to the Central Railway. Lettow-Vorbeck had gained some breathing space from the British forces pursuing him, and on 14 September he abandoned Kisaki and marched his forces south to establish a new base at Beho-Beho.

== Sources ==
- Askaris, Asymmetry, and Small Wars:Operational Art and the German East African Campaign, 1914–1918 A MONOGRAPH by Major Kenneth P. Adgie
- The First World War in Africa, by Hew Strachan. Oxford University Press, 2004. ISBN 978-0-19-925728-7
