= Han Suyin =

Chinese-Belgian-British physician and author (1916–2012)

Elizabeth KC Comber (aka Han Suyin)
- Born: Rosalie Matilda Kuanghu Chou; 12 September 1916; Xinyang, Henan, Republic of China
- Died: 2 November 2012 (aged 95); Lausanne, Vaud, Switzerland
- Resting place: Bois-de-Vaux Cemetery
- Citizenship: British
- Occupations: Author and physician
- Spouse(s): Tang Pao-Huang (1938–1947); Leon Comber (1952–1958); Vincent Ratnaswamy (1960–2003)
- Children: 2 (adopted)
- Writing career
- Pen name: Han Suyin
- Language: Chinese, English, French
- Period: 1942–2012
- Genres: Fiction, history, biographies
- Subjects: Mao Zedong, Zhou Enlai
- Notable works: A Many-Splendoured Thing; The Crippled Tree; My House Has Two Doors

Han Suyin
- Chinese: 周光瑚
Transcriptions
Standard Mandarin
- Hanyu Pinyin: Zhōu Guānghú
- Wade–Giles: Chou^{1} Kuang^{1}-hu^{2}

Alternative Chinese name
- Traditional Chinese: 韓素音
- Simplified Chinese: 韩素音
Transcriptions
Standard Mandarin
- Hanyu Pinyin: Hán Sùyīn
- Wade–Giles: Han^{2} Su^{4}-yin^{1}
- IPA: [xǎn sù.ín]

Rosalie Matilda Kuanghu Chou (Chinese: 周光瑚; 12 September 1917 or 1916 – 2 November 2012) was a Chinese-born Eurasian physician and author better known by her pen name Han Suyin (Chinese: 韓素音). She wrote in English and French on modern China, set her novels in East and Southeast Asia, and published autobiographical memoirs which covered the span of modern China. These writings gained her a reputation as an ardent and articulate supporter of the Chinese Communist Revolution. She lived in Lausanne, Switzerland, for many years until her death.

== Biography ==
Han Suyin was born in Xinyang, Henan, China. Her father was a Belgian-educated Chinese engineer, Chou Wei (Chinese: 周煒; pinyin: Zhōu Wěi), of Hakka heritage, while her mother, Marguerite Denis, was Belgian (Flemish).

She began work as a typist at Peking Union Medical College in 1931, not yet 15 years old. In 1933 she was admitted to Yenching University where she felt she was discriminated against as a Eurasian. In 1935 she went to Brussels to study medicine. In 1938 she returned to China, and married Tang Pao-Huang (Chinese: 唐保璜), a Chinese Nationalist military officer, who was to become a general. She worked as a midwife in an American Christian mission hospital in Chengdu, Sichuan. Her first novel, Destination Chungking (1942), was based on her experiences during this period. In 1940, she and her husband adopted their daughter, Tang Yungmei.

In 1944, she went with her daughter to London, where her husband Pao had been posted two years earlier as military attaché, to continue her studies in medicine at the Royal Free Hospital. Pao was subsequently posted to Washington and later to the Manchurian front. In 1947, while she was still in London, her husband died in action during the Chinese Civil War.

She graduated with MBBS (Bachelor of Medicine, Bachelor of Surgery) with Honours in 1948 and in 1949 went to Hong Kong to practice medicine at the Queen Mary Hospital. There she met and fell in love with Ian Morrison, a married Australian war correspondent based in Singapore, who was killed in Korea in 1950. She portrayed their relationship in the bestselling novel A Many-Splendoured Thing (Jonathan Cape, 1952) and the factual basis of their relationship is documented in her autobiography My House Has Two Doors (1980).

In 1952, she married Leon Comber, a British officer in the Malayan Special Branch, and went with him to Johor, Malaya (present-day Malaysia), where she worked in the Johor Bahru General Hospital and opened a clinic in Johor Bahru and Upper Pickering Street, Singapore. In 1953, she adopted a daughter, Chew Hui-Im (Hueiying), in Singapore.

In 1955, Han contributed efforts to the establishment of Nanyang University in Singapore. Specifically, she served as a physician at the institution, having refused an offer to teach literature. Chinese writer Lin Yutang, the first president of the university, had recruited her for the latter field, but she declined, indicating her desire "to make a new Asian literature, not teach Dickens".

Also in 1955, her best-known novel, A Many-Splendoured Thing, was filmed as Love Is a Many-Splendored Thing. The musical theme song, "Love Is a Many-Splendored Thing", won the Academy Award for Best Original Song. In her autobiography, My House Has Two Doors, she distanced herself from the film, saying that although it was shown for many weeks at the Cathay Cinema in Singapore to packed audiences, she never went to see it and that the film rights had been sold to pay for an operation on her adopted daughter who had pulmonary tuberculosis. Much later, the movie itself was made into a daytime soap opera, Love Is a Many Splendored Thing, which ran from 1967 to 1973 on American TV.

In 1956, she published the novel And the Rain My Drink, whose description of the guerrilla war of Chinese rubber workers against the government was perceived to be very anti-British, and Comber is said to have resigned as acting Assistant Commissioner of Police Special Branch mainly because of this. In a 2008 interview, he said: "The novel portrayed the British security forces in a rather slanted fashion, I thought. She was a rather pro-Left intellectual and a doctor. I understood the reasons why the communists might have felt the way they did, but I didn't agree with them taking up arms." After resigning, he moved into book publishing as the local representative for London publisher Heinemann. Han Suyin and Comber divorced in 1958.

In 1960, Han married Vincent Ratnaswamy, an Indian colonel, moving to India then later residing in Hong Kong and Switzerland, where she remained, living in Lausanne. Although later separated, they remained married until Ratnaswamy's death in January 2003.

After 1956, Han visited China almost annually. She was one of the first foreign nationals to visit Red China, including through the years of the Cultural Revolution. In 1974, she was the featured speaker at the founding national convention of the US-China Peoples Friendship Association in Los Angeles.

Han died in Lausanne on 2 November 2012, aged 95.

A very human account of Han Suyin, the physician, author, and woman, is provided in G. M. Glaskin's A Many-Splendoured Woman: A Memoir of Han Suyin, published in 1995.

== Influences ==
Han Suyin funded the Chinese Writers Association to create the "National Rainbow Award for Best Literary Translation" (which is now the Lu Xun Literary Award for Best Literary Translation) to help develop literature translation in China. The "Han Suyin Award for Young Translators", sponsored by the China International Publishing Group, was also set up by her, and as of 2009 it had conferred awards 21 times.

Han has also been influential in Asian American literature, as her books were published in English and contained depictions of Asians that were radically different from the portrayals found in both Anglo-American and Asian-American authors. Frank Chin, in his essay "Come All Ye Asian American Writers of the Real and the Fake", credits Han with being one of the few Chinese American writers (his term) who does not portray Chinese men as "emasculated and sexually repellent" and for being one of the few who "[wrote] knowledgeably and authentically of Chinese fairy tales, heroic tradition, and history".

== Bibliography ==
Cultural and political conflicts between East and West in modern history play a central role in Han Suyin's work. She also explores the struggle for liberation in Southeast Asia and the internal and foreign policies of modern China since the end of the imperial regime. Many of her writings feature the colonial backdrop in East Asia during the 19th and 20th centuries. A notable exception is the novella Winter Love, about a love affair between two young Englishwomen at the end of World War Two.

=== Novels ===
- Destination Chungking (1942)
- A Many-Splendoured Thing (1952)
- And the Rain My Drink (1956)
- The Mountain Is Young (1958)
- Two Loves (1962), which consists of two novelettes: Cast But One Shadow and Winter Love
- Cast But One Shadow (1962)
- Four Faces (1963)
- Till Morning Comes (1982)
- The Enchantress (1985)

=== Autobiographical works ===
- China
  - The Crippled Tree (1965) – covers China and her and her family's life from 1885 to 1928
  - A Mortal Flower (1966) – covers the years 1928–38
  - Birdless Summer (1968) – covers the years 1938–48
  - My House Has Two Doors (1980) – covers the years 1949–79 – split into two when released as paperback in 1982, with the second part called Phoenix Harvest
  - Phoenix Harvest (see above)
  - Wind in My Sleeve (1992) – covers the years 1977–91
- A Share of Loving (1987) – a more personal autobiography about Han Suyin, her Indian husband Vincent and Vincent's family
- Fleur de soleil – Histoire de ma vie (1988) – French only: Flower of sun – The story about my life

=== Screenplay ===
- Man's Fate (film) (1969) Unproduced film to have been directed by Fred Zinnemann.

=== Historical studies ===
- China in the Year 2001 (1967)
- Asia Today: Two Outlooks (1969)
- The Morning Deluge: Mao Tsetung and the Chinese Revolution 1893–1954 (1972)
- Lhasa, the Open City (1976)
- Wind in the Tower: Mao Tsetung and the Chinese Revolution, 1949–1975 (1976)
- China 1890–1938: From the Warlords to World War (1989; historical photo-reportage)
- Eldest Son: Zhou Enlai and the Making of Modern China (1994)

=== Essays ===
- Tigers and Butterflies: Selected Writings on Politics, Culture and Society (London: Earthscan, 1990)
- "Water Too Pure...", in Sarah LeFanu and Stephen Hayward (eds), Colours of a New Day: Writing for South Africa (London: Lawrence & Wishart, 1990), pp. 80–92.
