= The Crippled Tree =

- Author: Han Suyin
- Language: English
- Genre: Autobiography, history
- Publication date: 1965
- Publication place: United Kingdom
- Media type: Print (book)
- Pages: 448
- ISBN: 978-0-586-03836-9
- OCLC: 6492043
- Followed by: A Mortal Flower

The Crippled Tree is a history and biography by Han Suyin. It covers the years 1885 to 1928, beginning with the life of her father, a Belgium-educated Chinese engineer of Hakka heritage, from a family of minor gentry in Sichuan. It describes how he met and married her mother, a Flemish Belgian, his return to China, and her own birth and early life.

The Crippled Tree is the first book of Han's six-volume epic cycle on the modern history of China through the lens of her family.
