= Turbid Lake =

- Location within Wyoming
- Location: Park County, Wyoming
- Coordinates: 44.549906°N 110.260925°W
- Type: lake

Turbid Lake is a lake in Park County, Wyoming, in the United States. Turbid Lake was so named on account of its muddy water.

The lake is believed to have formed in the crater of a hydrothermal explosion some time around 1300 BC, which created a 4,200 by 5,000 by 100 ft (1,280 by 1,524 by 30 m) crater, the floor of which eventually filled up to form the lake.
