= Şəkərabad =

- Municipality
- Location within Azerbaijan
- Coordinates: 39°11′23″N 45°26′12″E
- Country: Azerbaijan
- Autonomous republic: Nakhchivan
- District: Babek

Population (2005)
  - Total: 985
- Time zone: UTC+4 (AZT)

Şəkərabad (also, Shakyarabad, Shekerabad, and Shekyarabad) is a village and municipality in the Babek District of Nakhchivan, Azerbaijan. It is located 4 km north from the district center, on the left bank of the Nakhchivanchay River. Its population is busy with grain-growing, vegetable-growing and animal husbandry. There is a secondary school, club, library, mosque and a medical center in the village. It has a population of 985.

== Etymology ==
According to the information of the 1886, the village consisted of 25 houses. The settlement had been established by a person named Sheker. The name of the village, Shekerabad means "a village which belongs to Sheker".

== Notable natives ==
- Islam Safarli — writer, Honored Art Worker of Azerbaijan SSR (1973).
