= And the Rain My Drink =

1956 novel by Han Suyin

- First edition
- Author: Han Suyin
- Language: English
- Publisher: Jonathan Cape
- Publication date: 1956
- Publication place: United Kingdom
- Media type: Print (book)
- Pages: 319
- OCLC: 15687917

And the Rain My Drink is a 1956 novel by Chinese-Flemish writer Han Suyin. Set against a backdrop of the Malayan Emergency of the late 1940s and 1950s, it describes the methods used by the British colonial authorities and by the left-wing rebels, and how individual lives were affected.

The story takes place during the fifth year of the Emergency, at a time when the Malayan National Liberation Army (MNLA) forces were decimated, but the war was far from over. To secure a steady supply of food and other necessities to the Communist guerilla forces hiding in the jungle, the Communist Party desperately tried to maintain contact with people living on the outside.

The novel has been regarded as semi-autobiographical. Han worked at the Johor Bahru General Hospital during the 50s and has many similarities with the narrator. One of the most important similarities is the sympathy for the communist detainees in Malaysia, which may have caused the novel to be perceived as anti-British-colonialism. Despite this perception, the novel was a success and became somewhat influential on turning public opinion against the British authority and its policies.

The novel also damaged the career of Han's then-husband, Leon Comber. In a November 2008 interview, Comber, who left the police force in 1956, three years before he and Han were finally divorced, commented: "The novel portrayed the British security forces in a rather slanted fashion, I thought. She was a rather pro-Left intellectual and also a doctor. I understood the reasons why the communists might have felt the way they did, but I didn't agree with them taking up arms."

The novel was republished in 2010 by Monsoon Books.
