= Turbid Creek (British Columbia) =

Stream in southwestern British Columbia, Canada

Coordinates: 50°04′16″N 123°20′37″W

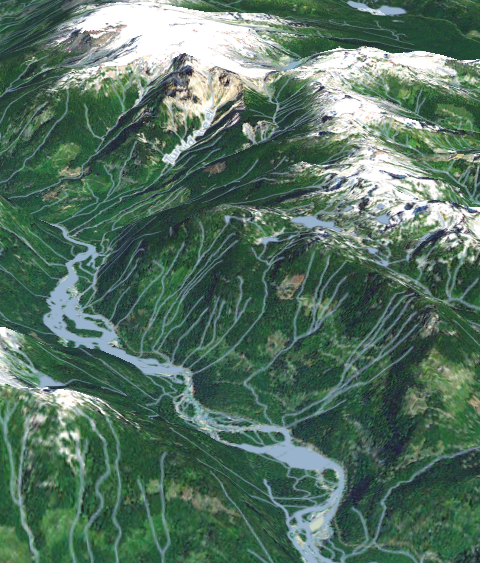
NASA World Wind imagery of the Squamish River showing Turbid Creek.

Turbid Creek is a stream in southwestern British Columbia, Canada, flowing southwest into the Squamish River.
