= Turbid Creek (Alaska) =

Stream in North Slope Borough, Alaska, U.S.

Coordinates: 68°52′39″N 163°08′48″W

Turbid Creek is a stream in North Slope Borough, Alaska, in the United States. It is a tributary of the Kukpowruk River.

Turbid Creek was so named in 1949 on account of its muddy water.

== See also ==
- List of rivers of Alaska
