= A Many-Splendoured Thing =

1952 novel by Han Suyin

- First edition
- Author: Han Suyin
- Language: English
- Publisher: Jonathan Cape
- Publication date: 1952
- Publication place: United Kingdom
- Media type: Print (book)
- Pages: 384
- OCLC: 8843292

A Many-Splendoured Thing is a novel by Han Suyin that was a bestseller upon publication in London in 1952 by Jonathan Cape. The book was made into the 1955 film Love Is a Many-Splendored Thing, which inspired a popular eponymous song. In her 1980 autobiographical work, My House Has Two Doors, Suyin evinced no interest in watching the film even in Singapore, where it ran for several months. Her motive in selling the film rights was to pay for an operation in England for her adopted daughter who had pulmonary tuberculosis.

The story portrays Han Suyin, a Eurasian doctor originally from Mainland China who trained at the London Royal Free Hospital Medical College in London University, who falls in love with a married British foreign correspondent named Mark Elliott (Ian Morrison in real life, living in Singapore with his wife and children). On the surface it is a love story but it has historical perspective relating to China, Hong Kong, and the peoples and societies that populated the island. This includes many who have fled from the final stages of the Chinese Civil War, both Chinese and Europeans long settled in China.

Although it is a novel, the book is strongly autobiographical. Han Suyin's real-life lover was killed during the Korean War in 1950. Two years later, she married Leon F. Comber, a British officer in the Malayan Special Branch. Han Suyin died in November 2012, aged 95.
