= Kisaki, Tanzania =

Kisaki
- Location in Tanzania
- Coordinates: 7°28′S 37°36′E
- Country: Tanzania
- Region: Morogoro Region
- Elevation: 958 ft (292 m)
- Time zone: UTC+3 (East Africa Time)
- Climate: Aw

Kisaki is a small town in eastern Tanzania.

== Transport ==
It is served by a small station on the TAZARA railway.

== See also ==
- Railway stations in Tanzania
