= Battle of the Somme =

WWI battle pitting France and Britain against Germany

- Part of the Western Front of the First World War
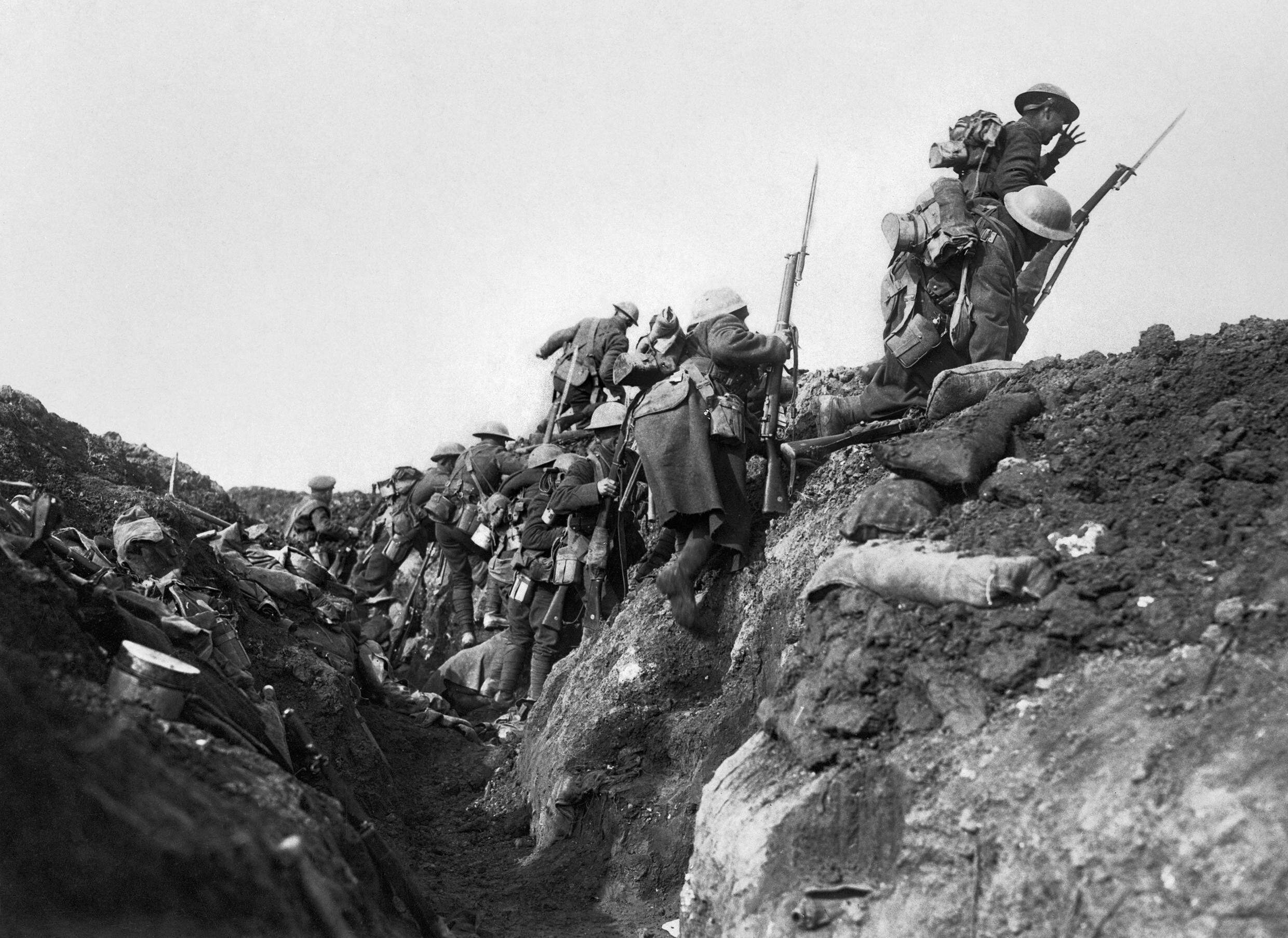
- Troops "going over the top" at the start of the Battle of the Somme in 1916.
Date	1 July – 18 November 1916 (4 months, 2 weeks and 3 days)
Location	Somme River, north-central Somme and south-eastern Pas-de-Calais Départements, France 50°00′56″N 02°41′51″E
Result	Inconclusive
Territorial changes	Bulge driven into the Noyon Salient

Belligerents
British Empire: United Kingdom; Canada; Australia; New Zealand; Egypt; South Africa; India; Newfoundland; Bermuda; Rhodesia; France	German Empire

Commanders and leaders
(United Kingdom of Great Britain and Ireland) Douglas Haig (United Kingdom of Great Britain and Ireland) Edmund Allenby (United Kingdom of Great Britain and Ireland) Henry Rawlinson (United Kingdom of Great Britain and Ireland) Hubert Gough (French Third Republic) Joseph Joffre (French Third Republic) Ferdinand Foch (French Third Republic) Émile Fayolle (French Third Republic) Joseph Alfred Micheler	(German Empire) Erich von Falkenhayn (German Empire) Paul von Hindenburg (German Empire) Erich Ludendorff (German Empire) (Kingdom of Bavaria) Rupprecht of Bavaria (German Empire) Max von Gallwitz (German Empire) Fritz von Below

Strength
1 July (British Empire) 13 divisions (French Third Republic) 11 divisions July–November (British Empire) 50 divisions (French Third Republic) 48 divisions	1 July (German Empire) 10 1/2 divisions July–November (German Empire) 50 divisions

Casualties and losses
(United Kingdom of Great Britain and Ireland) c. 420,000 (French Third Republic) c. 200,000	British figures c. 440,000–600,000 German figures 237,159–429,209 (Note: John Mosier, G.J. Meyer: 237,159; Gerd Hirschfeld et alii: 335,688; Watson via the Sanitätsbericht: 429,209) 41,605 men captured by the French; 31,396 men captured by the British
- The Somme Battle of the Somme (Europe)

The Battle of the Somme (French: Bataille de la Somme; German: Schlacht an der Somme), also known as the Somme offensive, was a battle of the First World War fought by the armies of the British Empire and the French Republic against the German Empire. It took place between 1 July and 18 November 1916 on both sides of the upper reaches of the river Somme in France. The battle was intended to hasten a victory for the Allies. More than three million men fought in the battle, of whom more than one million were either wounded or killed, making it one of the deadliest battles in human history. It illustrated the deadly potential of mechanized warfare that began in the mid-19th century.

The French and British had planned an offensive on the Somme during the Chantilly Conference in December 1915. The Allies agreed upon a strategy of combined offensives against the Central Powers in 1916 by the French, Russian, British and Italian armies, with the Somme offensive as the Franco-British contribution. The French army was to undertake the main part of the Somme offensive, supported on the northern flank by the Fourth Army of the British Expeditionary Force (BEF). When the Imperial German Army began the Battle of Verdun on the Meuse on 21 February 1916, French commanders diverted many of the divisions intended for the Somme and the "supporting" attack by the British became the principal effort. British forces comprised a mixture of wartime volunteers from the Territorial Force and Kitchener's Army with the remains of the pre-war army.

On the first day on the Somme (1 July) the German 2nd Army suffered a serious defeat opposite the French Sixth Army, from Foucaucourt-en-Santerre south of the Somme to Maricourt on the north bank and by the Fourth Army from Maricourt to the vicinity of the Albert–Bapaume road. The 57,470 casualties suffered by the British, including 19,240 killed, were the worst in the history of the British Army. Most of the British casualties were suffered on the front between the Albert–Bapaume road and Gommecourt to the north, which was the area where the principal German defensive effort (Schwerpunkt) was made. The battle became notable for the importance of air power and the first use of the tank in September but these were a product of new technology and proved unreliable.

At the end of the battle, British and French forces had penetrated 6.2 miles (10 km) into German-occupied territory along the majority of the front, their largest territorial gain since the First Battle of the Marne in 1914. The operational objectives of the Anglo-French armies were not achieved, as they failed to capture Péronne and Bapaume, where the German armies maintained their positions over the winter. British attacks in the Ancre valley resumed in January 1917 and forced the Germans into local withdrawals in February before the strategic retreat by about 25 mi (40 km) in Operation Alberich to the Siegfriedstellung (Hindenburg Line) in March 1917. Debate continues over the necessity, significance and effect of the battle.

== Strategic developments ==
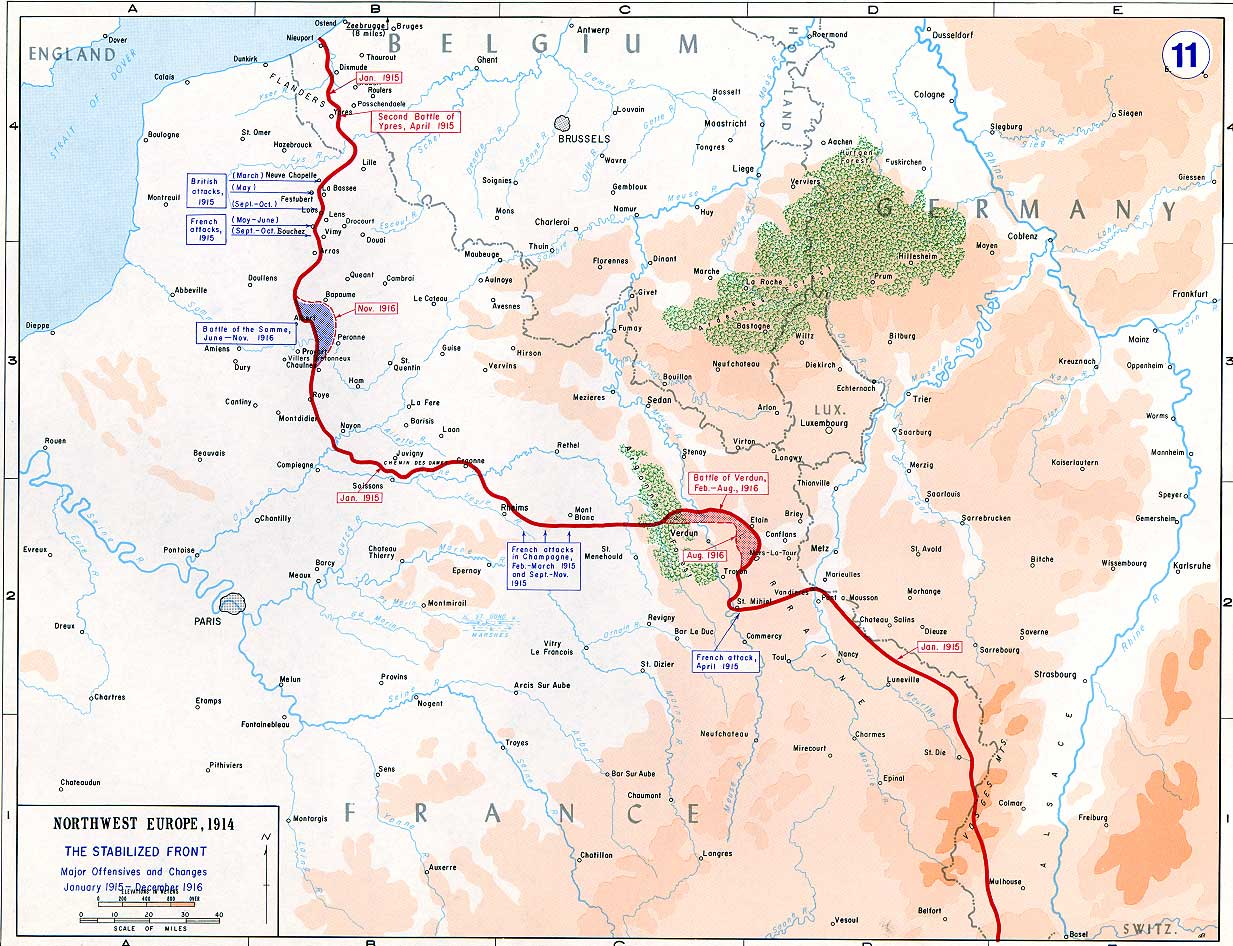
The Western Front (January 1915 – December 1916)

Allied war strategy for 1916 was decided at the Chantilly Conference from 6 to 8 December 1915. Simultaneous offensives on the Eastern Front by the Russian army, on the Italian Front by the Italian army and on the Western Front by the Franco-British armies were to be carried out to deny time for the Central Powers to move troops between fronts during lulls. In December 1915, General Sir Douglas Haig replaced Field Marshal Sir John French as Commander-in-Chief of the BEF. Haig favoured a British offensive in Flanders, close to BEF supply routes, to drive the Germans from the Belgian coast and end the U-boat threat from Belgian waters. Haig was not formally subordinate to Marshal Joseph Joffre but the British played a lesser role on the Western Front and complied with French strategy.

In January 1916, Joffre had agreed to the BEF making its main effort in Flanders but in February 1916 it was decided to mount a combined offensive where the French and British armies met, astride the Somme River in Picardy before the British offensive in Flanders. A week later the Germans began the Battle of Verdun against the French army. The costly defence of Verdun forced the army to divert divisions intended for the Somme offensive, eventually reducing the French contribution to 13 divisions in the Sixth Army, against 20 British divisions. By 31 May, the ambitious Franco-British plan for a decisive victory had been reduced to a limited offensive to relieve pressure on the French at Verdun and inflict attrition on the German armies in the west.

The Chief of the German General Staff, Erich von Falkenhayn, intended to end the war by splitting the Anglo-French Entente in 1916, before its material superiority became unbeatable. Falkenhayn planned to defeat the large number of reserves which the Entente could move into the path of a breakthrough, by threatening a sensitive point close to the existing front line and provoking the French into counter-attacking German positions. Falkenhayn chose to attack towards Verdun to take the Meuse heights and make Verdun untenable. The French would have to conduct a counter-offensive on ground dominated by the German army and ringed with masses of heavy artillery, leading to huge losses and bringing the French army close to collapse. The British would mount a hasty relief offensive and suffer similar losses. Falkenhayn expected the relief offensive to fall south of Arras against the 6th Army and be destroyed. Despite the certainty by mid-June of an Anglo-French attack on the Somme against the 2nd Army, Falkenhayn sent only four divisions, keeping eight in the western strategic reserve.

No divisions were taken from the Sixth Army, despite it holding a shorter line with 17 1/2 divisions and three of the divisions in OHL reserve behind the 6th Army. The maintenance of the strength of the 6th Army, at the expense of the 2nd Army on the Somme, indicated that Falkenhayn intended the counter-offensive against the British to be made north of the Somme front, once the British offensive had been shattered. If such Franco-British defeats were not enough, Germany would attack the remnants of both armies and end the western alliance for good. The unexpected length of the Verdun offensive, and the need to replace many drained units at Verdun, depleted the German strategic reserve placed behind the 6th Army, which held the Western Front from Hannescamps, 11 mi (18 km) south-west of Arras to St Eloi, south of Ypres and reduced the German counter-offensive strategy north of the Somme to one of passive and unyielding defence.

=== Battle of Verdun ===
The Battle of Verdun (21 February – 16 December 1916) began a week after Joffre and Haig agreed to mount an offensive on the Somme. The German offensive at Verdun was intended to threaten the capture of the city and induce the French to fight an attrition battle, in which German advantages of terrain and firepower would cause the French disproportionate casualties. The battle changed the nature of the offensive on the Somme, as French divisions were diverted to Verdun, and the main effort by the French diminished to a supporting attack for the British. German overestimation of the cost of Verdun to the French contributed to the concentration of German infantry and guns on the north bank of the Somme. By May, Joffre and Haig had changed their expectations of an offensive on the Somme, from a decisive battle to a hope that it would relieve Verdun and keep German divisions in France, which would assist the Russian armies conducting the Brusilov Offensive. The German offensive at Verdun was suspended in July, and troops, guns, and ammunition were transferred to Picardy, leading to a similar transfer of the French Tenth Army to the Somme front. Later in the year, the Franco-British were able to attack on the Somme and at Verdun sequentially and the French recovered much of the ground lost on the east bank of the Meuse in October and December.

=== Brusilov offensive ===
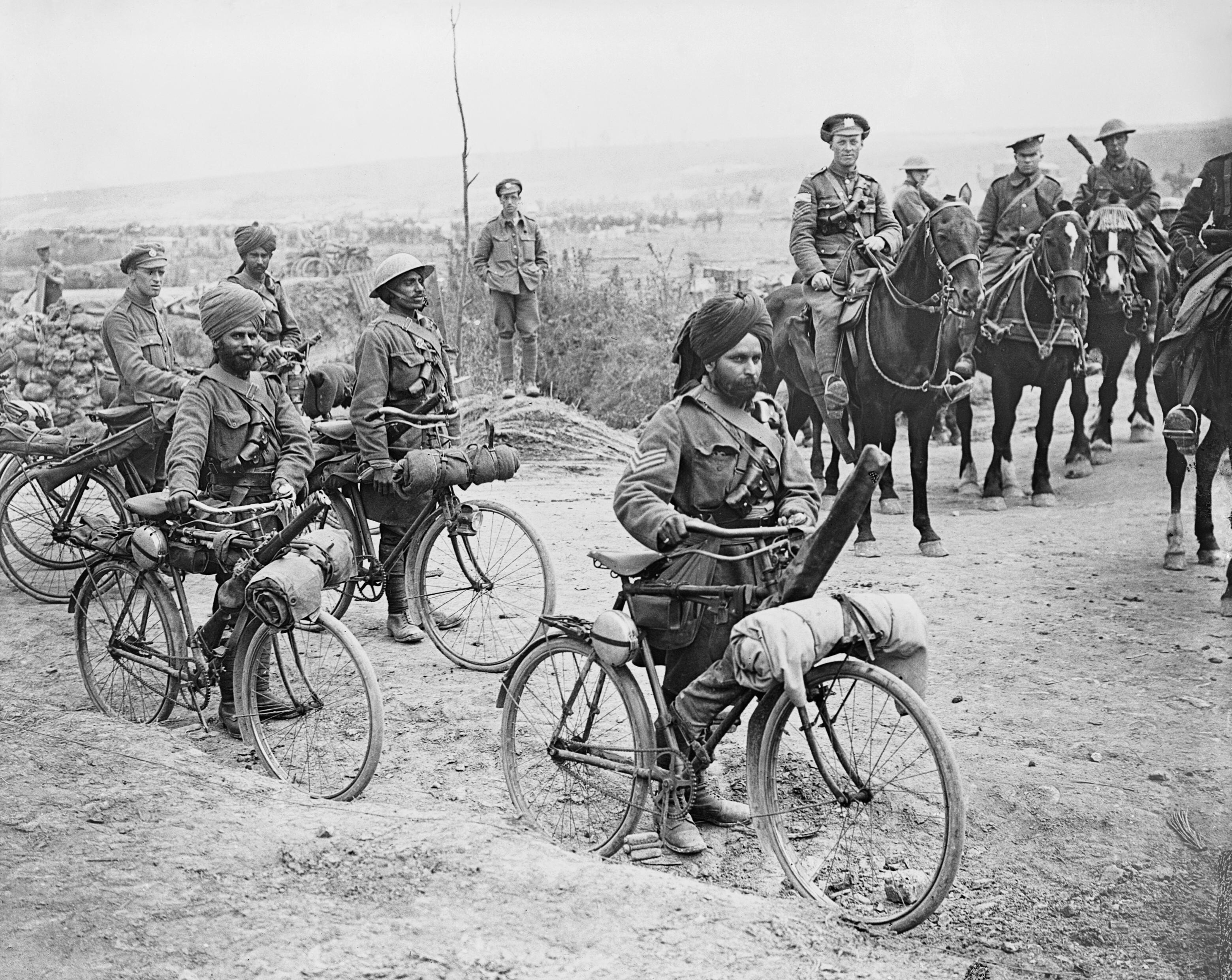
Troops of the British Indian Army at Battle of the Somme.

The Brusilov offensive (4 June – 20 September) on the Eastern Front absorbed the extra forces that had been requested on 2 June by Fritz von Below, commanding the German Second Army, for a spoiling attack on the Somme. On 4 June, Russian armies attacked on a 200 mi (320 km) front, from the Romanian frontier to Pinsk and eventually advanced 93 mi (150 km), reaching the foothills of the Carpathian mountains, against German and Austro-Hungarian troops of Armeegruppe von Linsingen and Armeegruppe Archduke Joseph. During the offensive the Russians inflicted c. 1,500,000 losses including c. 407,000 prisoners. Three divisions were ordered from France to the Eastern Front on 9 June and the spoiling attack on the Somme was abandoned. Only four more divisions were sent to the Somme front before the Anglo-French offensive began, bringing the total to 10 1/2 divisions. Falkenhayn and then Hindenburg and Ludendorff, were forced to send divisions to Russia throughout the summer to prevent a collapse of the Austro-Hungarian army and then to conduct a counter-offensive against Romania, which declared war against the Central Powers on 27 August. In July there were 112 German divisions on the Western Front and 52 divisions in Russia and in November there were 121 divisions in the west and 76 divisions in the east.

=== Tactical developments ===
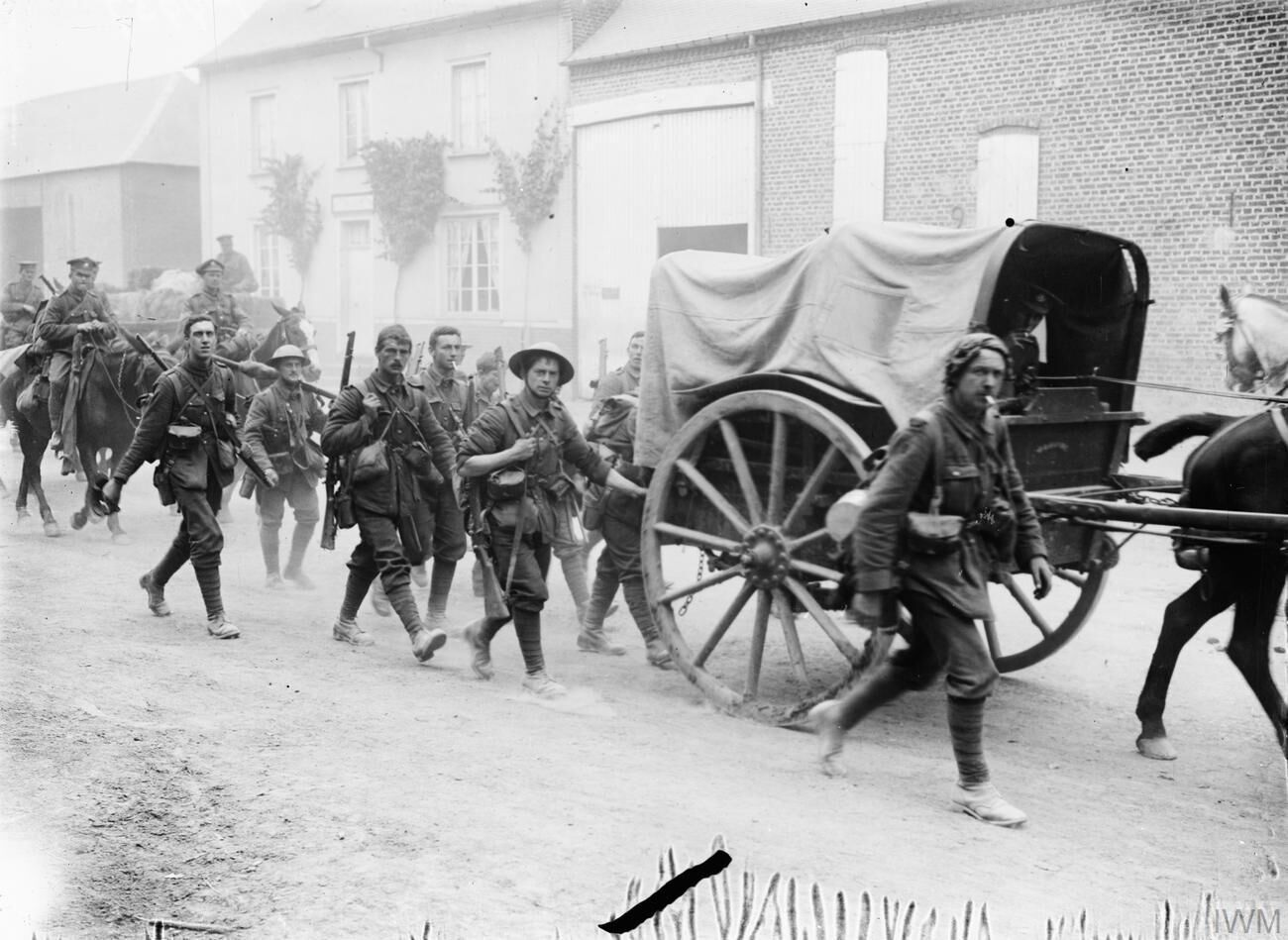
Men of the 10th (Service) Battalion, East Yorkshire Regiment of the 31st Division marching to the front line, 28 June 1916.

The original British Expeditionary Force (BEF) of six divisions and the Cavalry Division, had lost most of the British pre-war regulars in the battles of 1914 and 1915. The bulk of the army was made up of volunteers of the Territorial Force and Kitchener's Army, which had begun forming in August 1914. Rapid expansion created many vacancies for senior commands and specialist functions, which led to many appointments of retired officers and inexperienced newcomers. In 1914, Douglas Haig had been a lieutenant-general in command of I Corps and was promoted to command the First Army in early 1915 and then the BEF in December, which eventually comprised five armies with sixty divisions. The swift increase in the size of the army reduced the average level of experience within it and created an acute equipment shortage. Many officers resorted to directive command to avoid delegating to novice subordinates, although divisional commanders were given great latitude in training and planning for the attack of 1 July, since the heterogeneous nature of the 1916 army made it impossible for corps and army commanders to know the capacity of each division.

Despite considerable debate among German staff officers, Erich von Falkenhayn continued the policy of unyielding defence in 1916. Falkenhayn implied after the war that the psychology of German soldiers, shortage of manpower and lack of reserves made the policy inescapable, as the troops necessary to seal off breakthroughs did not exist. High losses incurred in holding ground by a policy of no retreat were preferable to higher losses, voluntary withdrawals and the effect of a belief that soldiers had discretion to avoid battle. When a more flexible policy was substituted later, decisions about withdrawal were still reserved to army commanders. On the Somme front, Falkenhayn's construction plan of January 1915 had been completed. Barbed wire obstacles had been enlarged from one belt 5–10 yards (4.6–9.1 m) wide to two, 30 yards (27 m) wide and about 15 yards (14 m) apart. Double and triple thickness wire was used and laid 3–5 feet (0.91–1.52 m) high. The front line had been increased from one trench line to a position of three lines 150–200 yards (140–180 m) apart, the first trench (Kampfgraben) occupied by sentry groups, the second (Wohngraben) for the bulk of the front-trench garrison and the third trench for local reserves. The trenches were traversed and had sentry-posts in concrete recesses built into the parapet. Dugouts had been deepened from 6–9 feet (1.8–2.7 m) to 20–30 feet (6.1–9.1 m), 50 yards (46 m) apart and large enough for 25 men. An intermediate line of strongpoints (the Stützpunktlinie) about 1,000 yards (910 m) behind the front line was also built. Communication trenches ran back to the reserve line, renamed the second position, which was as well-built and wired as the first position. The second position was beyond the range of Allied field artillery, to force an attacker to stop and move field artillery forward before assaulting the position.

== Prelude ==
=== Anglo-French plan of attack ===
Map of the Valley of the Somme

French losses at Verdun reduced the contribution available for the offensive on the Somme and increased the urgency for the commencement of operations on the Somme. The principal role in the offensive devolved to the British and on 16 June, Haig defined the objectives of the offensive as the relief of pressure on the French at Verdun and the infliction of losses on the Germans. After a five-day artillery bombardment, the British Fourth Army was to capture 27,000 yards (25,000 m) of the German first line, from Montauban to Serre and the Third Army was to mount a diversion at Gommecourt. In a second phase, the Fourth Army was to take the German second position, from Pozières to the Ancre and then the second position south of the Albert–Bapaume Road, ready for an attack on the German third position south of the road towards Flers, when the Reserve Army which included three cavalry divisions, would exploit the success to advance east and then north towards Arras. The French Sixth Army, with one corps on the north bank from Maricourt to the Somme and two corps on the south bank southwards to Foucaucourt, would make a subsidiary attack to guard the right flank of the main attack being made by the British.

=== Betrayal of British plans ===
Research in German archives revealed in 2016 that the date and location of the British offensive had been betrayed to German interrogators by two politically disgruntled soldiers several weeks in advance. The German military accordingly undertook significant defensive preparatory work on the British section of the Somme offensive. Other intelligence which warned the Germans included POW reports, interception of Rawlinson's message to his troops and early detonation of a mine. Thus alerted, the Germans were waiting in their trenches when the British troops went over the top.

=== German defences on the Somme ===
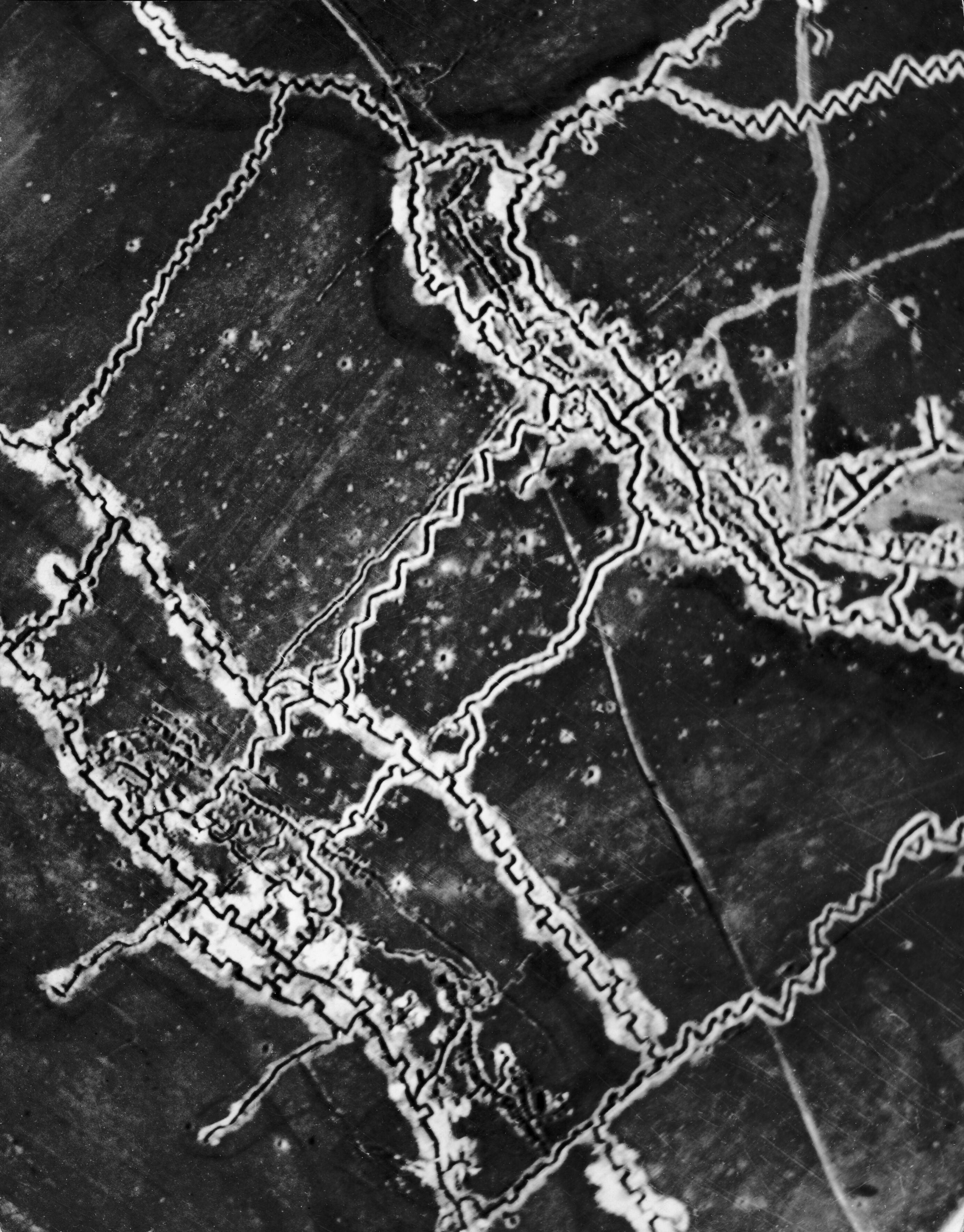
British aerial photograph of German trenches north of Thiepval, 10 May 1916, with the German forward lines to the lower left. The crenellated appearance of the trenches is due to the presence of traverses.

After the Autumn Battles (Herbstschlacht) of 1915, a third defensive position another 3,000 yards (1.7 mi; 2.7 km) back from the Stützpunktlinie (Support line) begun in February 1916 and was almost complete on the Somme front when the battle began. German artillery was organised in a series of Sperrfeuerstreifen (barrage sectors); each officer was expected to know the batteries covering his section of the front line and the batteries ready to engage fleeting targets. A telephone system was built, with lines buried 6 feet (1.8 m) deep for 5 mi (8.0 km) behind the front line, to connect the front line to the artillery. The Somme defences had two inherent weaknesses that the rebuilding had not remedied. The front trenches were on a forward slope, lined by white chalk from the subsoil and easily seen by ground observers. The defences were crowded towards the front trench with a regiment having two battalions near the front-trench system and the reserve battalion divided between the Stützpunktlinie and the second position, all within 2,000 yards (1,800 m) of no man's land and most troops within 1,000 yards (910 m) of the front line, accommodated in the new deep dugouts. The concentration of troops at the front line on a forward slope guaranteed that it would face the bulk of an artillery bombardment, directed by ground observers on clearly marked lines.

== Battles of the Somme, 1916 ==
=== First phase: 1–17 July 1916 ===
==== Battle of Albert, 1–13 July ====
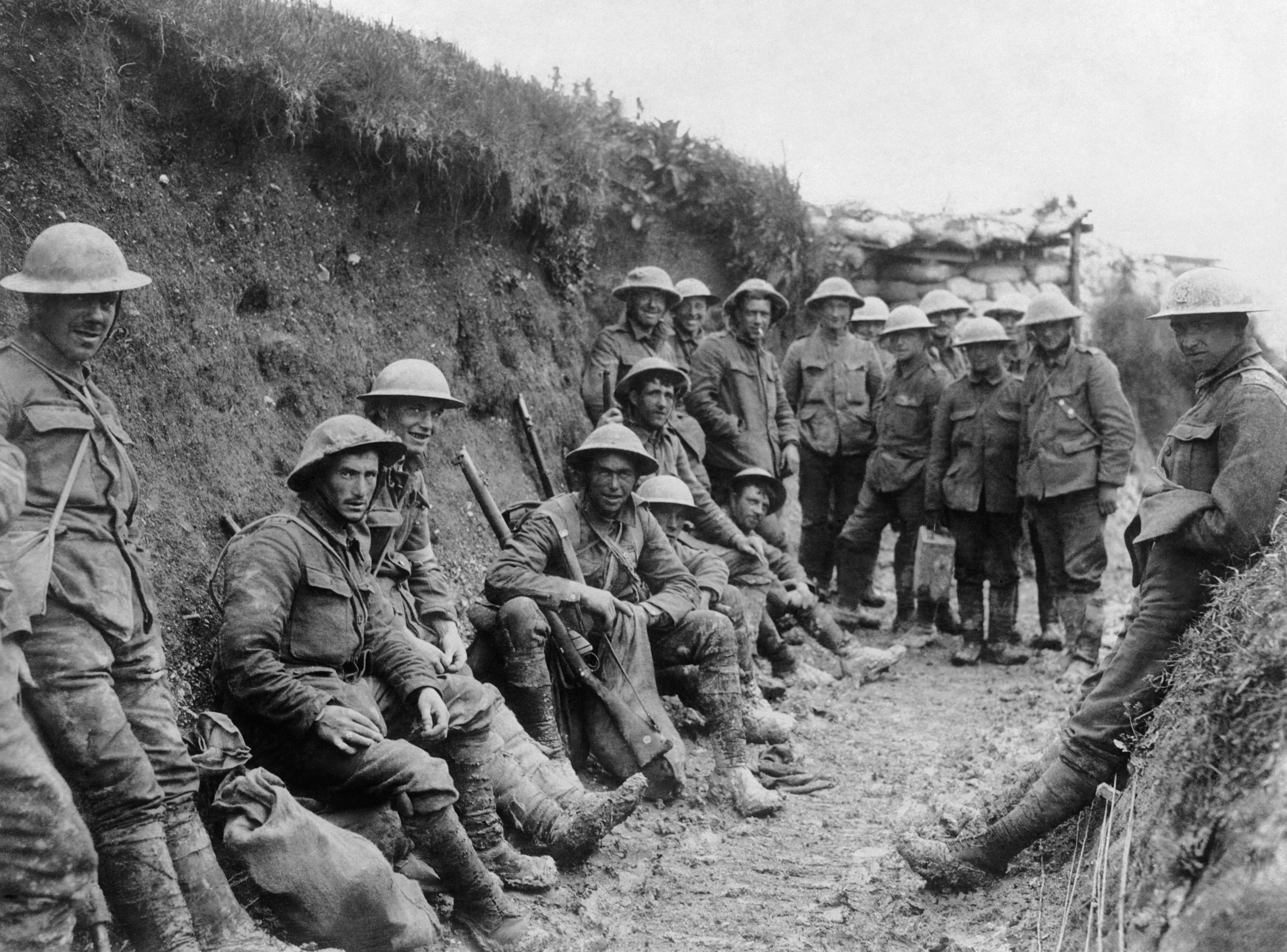
Royal Irish Rifles at the beginning of the battle.

The Battle of Albert was the first two weeks of Anglo-French offensive operations in the Battle of the Somme. The Allied preparatory artillery bombardment began on 24 June and the Anglo-French infantry attacked on 1 July, on the south bank from Foucaucourt to the Somme and from the Somme north to Gommecourt, 2 mi (3.2 km) beyond Serre. The French Sixth Army and the right wing of the British Fourth Army inflicted a considerable defeat on the German Second Army, but from the Albert–Bapaume road to Gommecourt the British attack was a disaster where most of the c. 60,000 British casualties were incurred. Against Joffre's wishes, Haig abandoned the offensive north of the road, to reinforce the success in the south, where the Anglo-French forces pressed forward towards the German second line, preparatory to a general attack on 14 July.

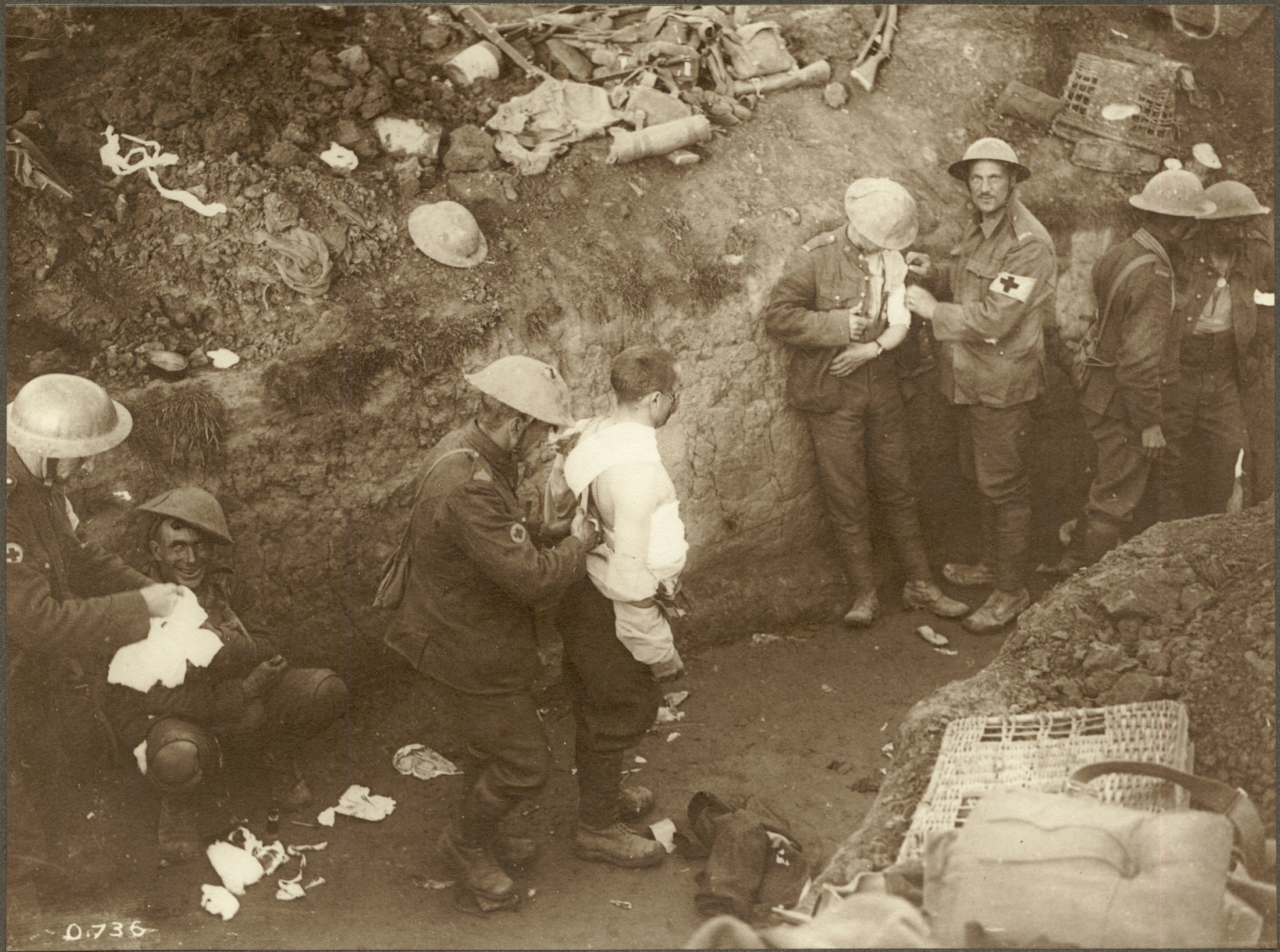
Canadian Troops Dressing Wounded in a trench during Battle of September 1916

===== First day =====
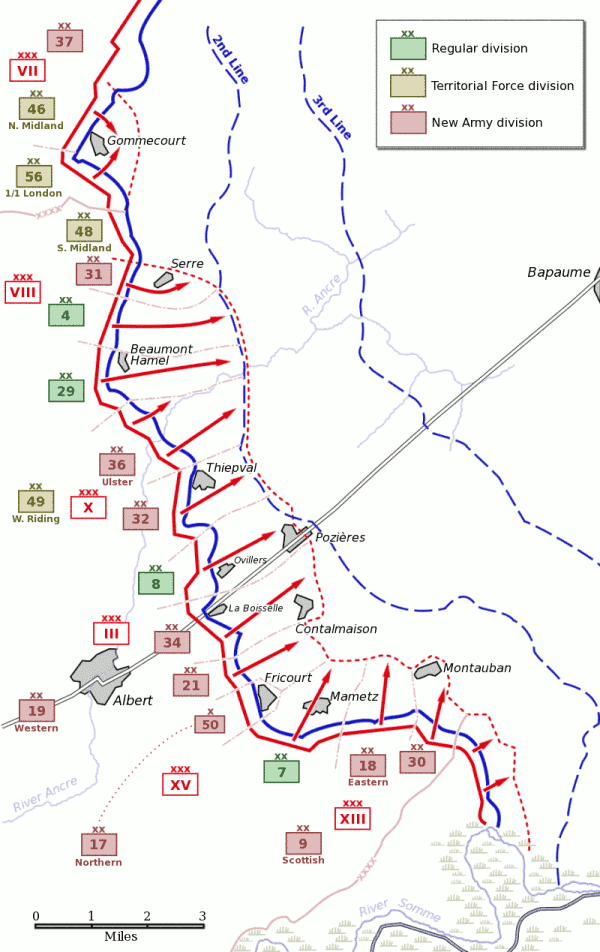
British objectives, 1 July 1916

The Battle of the Somme lasted 141 days beginning with the opening day of the Battle of Albert. The attack was made by five divisions of the French Sixth Army on the east side of the Somme, eleven British divisions of the Fourth Army north of the Somme to Serre and two divisions of the Third Army opposite Gommecourt, against the German Second Army of General Fritz von Below. The German defence south of the Albert–Bapaume road mostly collapsed and the French had "complete success" on both banks of the Somme, as did the British from the army boundary at Maricourt to the Albert–Bapaume road. On the south bank the German defence was made incapable of resisting another attack and a substantial retreat began; on the north bank the abandonment of Fricourt was ordered. The defenders on the commanding ground north of the road inflicted a huge defeat on the British infantry, who took an unprecedented number of casualties. Several truces were negotiated to recover wounded from no man's land north of the road. The Fourth Army took 57,470 casualties, of which 19,240 men were killed. The French Sixth Army had 1,590 casualties, and the 2nd German Army had 10,000–12,000 losses.

==== Battle of Bazentin Ridge, 14–17 July ====
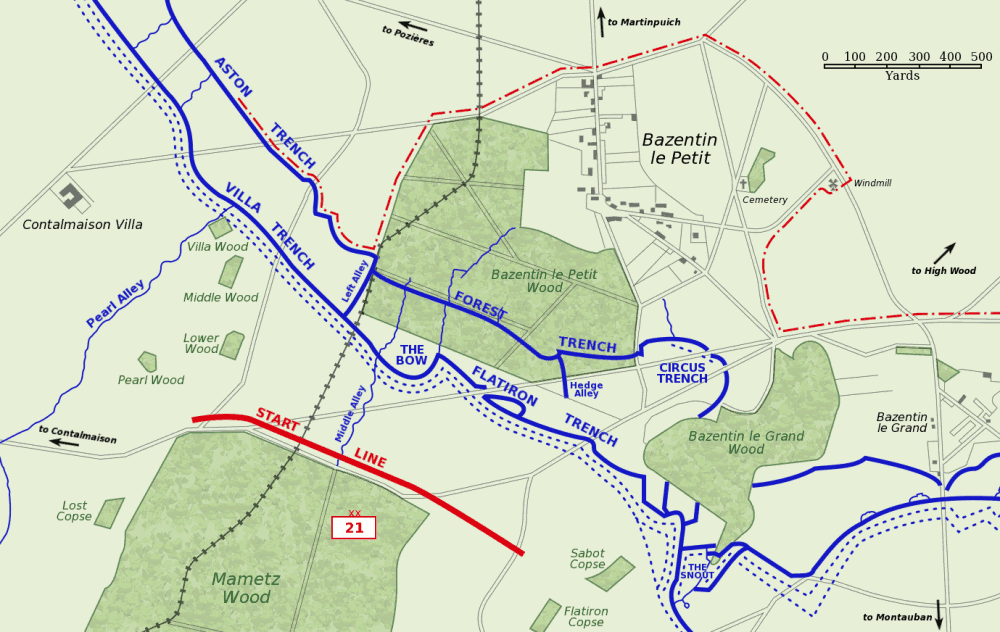
The British 21st Division attack on Bazentin le Petit, 14 July 1916.

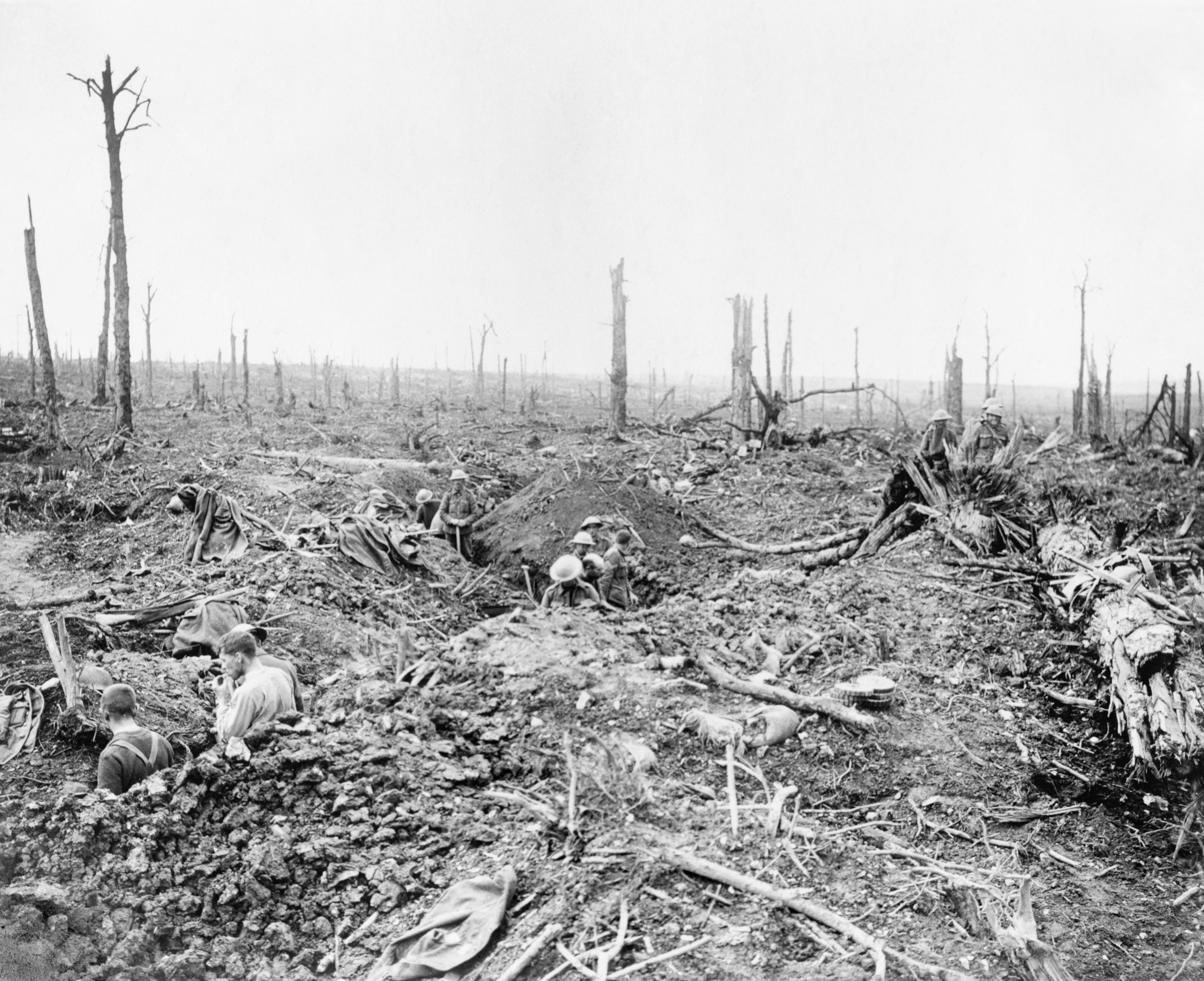
Soldiers digging a communication trench through Delville Wood

The Fourth Army attacked the German second defensive position from the Somme past Guillemont and Ginchy, north-west along the crest of the ridge to Pozières on the Albert–Bapaume road. The objectives of the attack were the villages of Bazentin le Petit, Bazentin le Grand and Longueval which was adjacent to Delville Wood, with High Wood on the ridge beyond. The attack was made by four divisions on a front of 6,000 yd (5.5 km) at 3:25 a.m. after a five-minute hurricane artillery bombardment. Field artillery fired a creeping barrage and the attacking waves pushed up close behind it in no man's land, leaving them only a short distance to cross when the barrage lifted from the German front trench. Most of the objective was captured and the German defence south of the Albert–Bapaume road put under great strain but the attack was not followed up due to British communication failures, casualties and disorganisation.

==== Battle of Fromelles, 19–20 July ====
The Battle of Fromelles was a subsidiary attack to support the Fourth Army on the Somme 80 km (50 mi) to the south, to exploit any weakening of the German defences opposite. Preparations for the attack were rushed, the troops involved lacked experience in trench warfare and the power of the German defence was "gravely" underestimated, the attackers being outnumbered 2:1. On 19 July, von Falkenhayn had judged the British attack to be the anticipated offensive against the 6th Army. Next day, Falkenhayn ordered the Guard Reserve Corps to be withdrawn to reinforce the Somme front. The Battle of Fromelles had inflicted some losses on the German defenders but gained no ground and deflected few German troops bound for the Somme. The attack was the debut of the Australian Imperial Force on the Western Front and, according to McMullin, "the worst 24 hours in Australia's entire history". Of 7,080 BEF casualties, 5,533 losses were incurred by the 5th Australian Division; German losses were 1,600–2,000, with 150 taken prisoner.

=== Second phase: July–September 1916 ===
==== Battle of Delville Wood, 14 July – 15 September ====
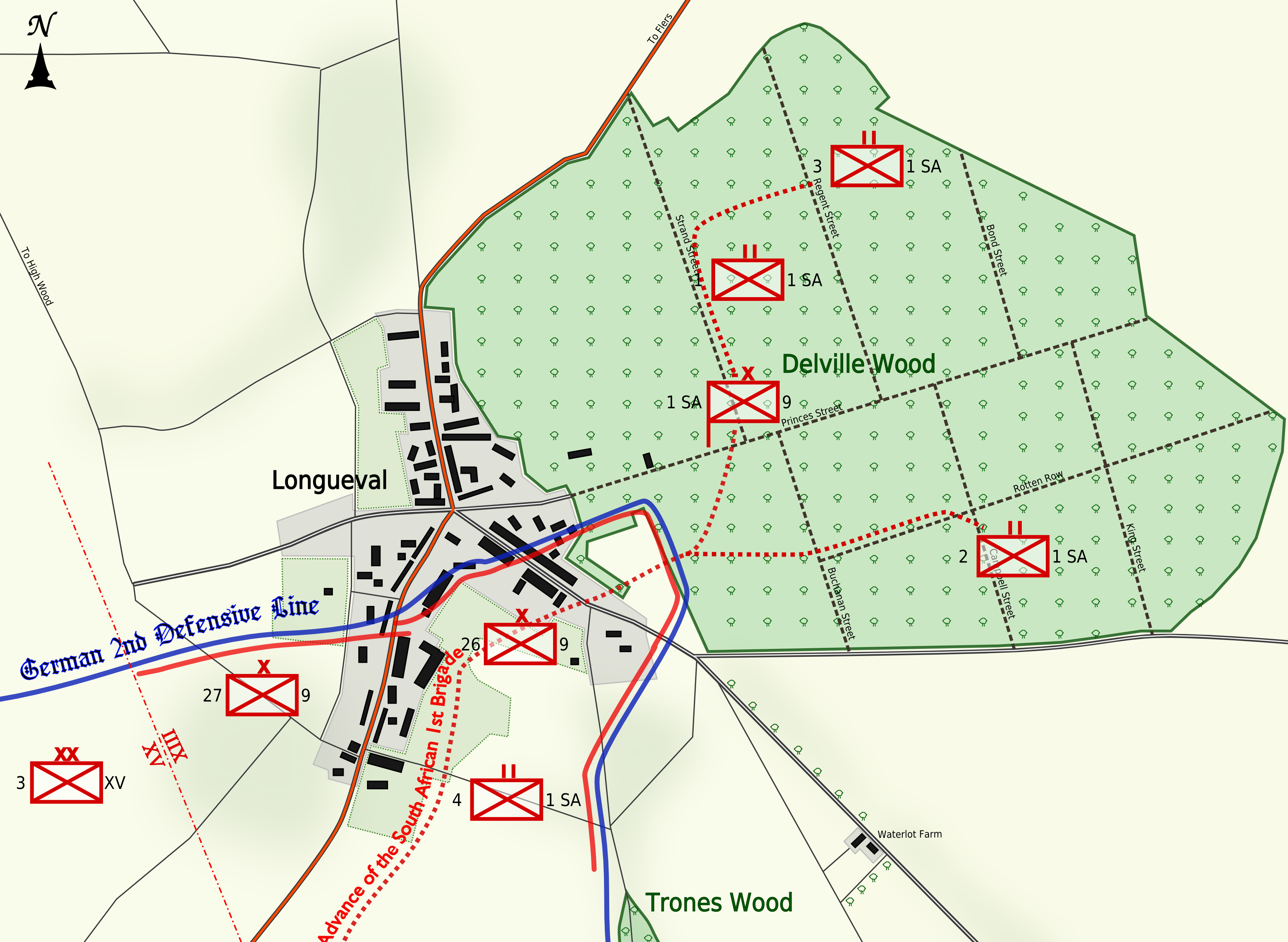
Positions on 14 July 1916

The Battle of Delville Wood was an operation to secure the British right flank, while the centre advanced to capture the higher-lying areas of High Wood and Pozières. After the Battle of Albert the offensive had evolved to the capture of fortified villages, woods, and other terrain that offered observation for artillery fire, jumping-off points for more attacks, and other tactical advantages. The mutually costly fighting at Delville Wood eventually secured the British right flank and marked the Western Front debut of the South African 1st Infantry Brigade (incorporating a Southern Rhodesian contingent), which held the wood from 15 to 20 July. When relieved, the brigade had lost 2,536 men, similar to the casualties of many brigades on 1 July.

==== Battle of Pozières, 23 July – 7 August ====
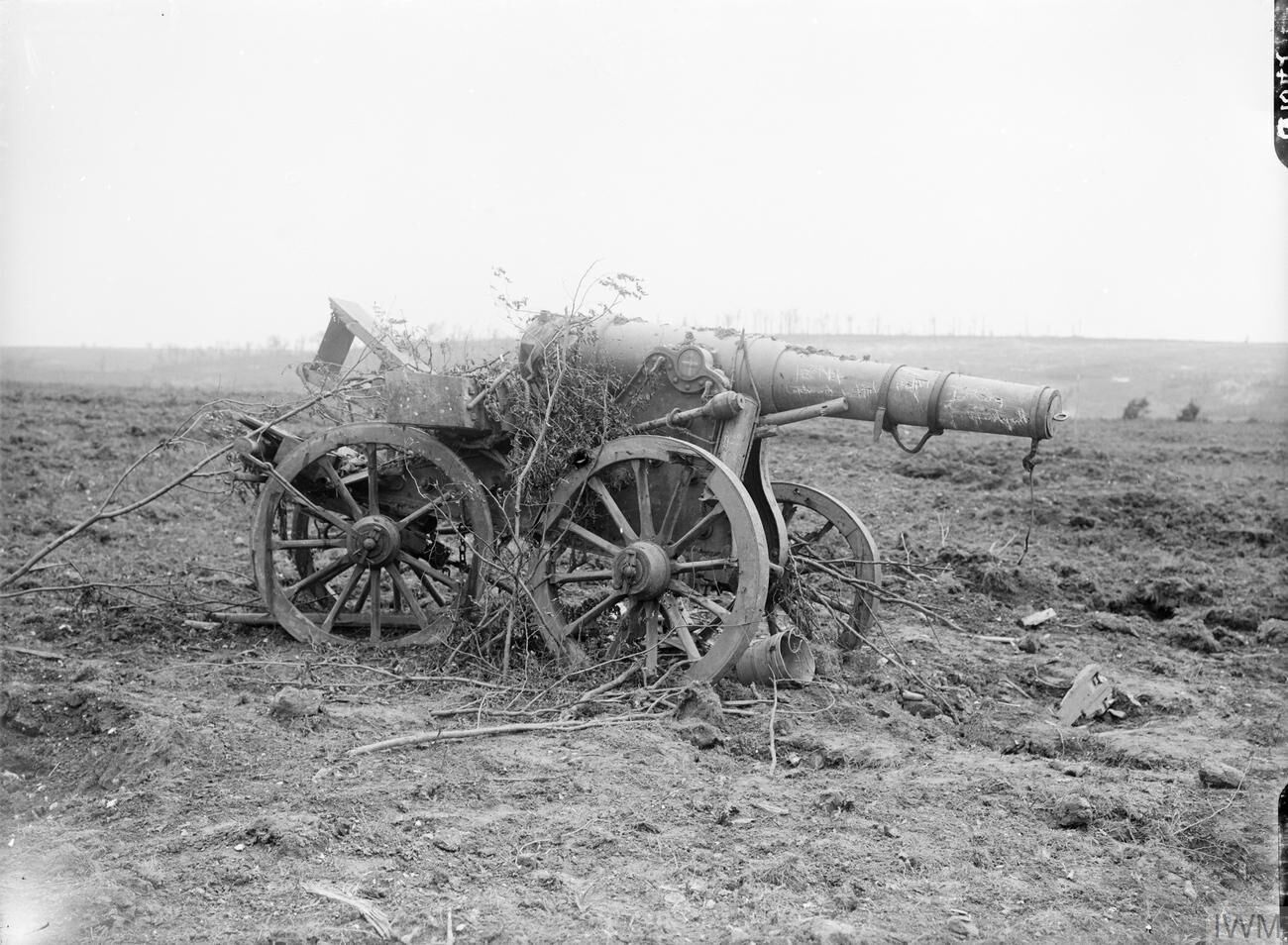
Captured 15 cm (150 mm) Ringkanone 92 German gun near Mametz Wood, 10 August 1916.

The Battle of Pozières began with the capture of the village by the 1st Australian Division (Australian Imperial Force) of the Reserve Army, the only British success in the Allied fiasco of 22/23 July, when a general attack combined with the French further south, degenerated into a series of separate attacks due to communication failures, supply failures and poor weather. German bombardments and counter-attacks began on 23 July and continued until 7 August. The fighting ended with the Reserve Army taking the plateau north and east of the village, overlooking the fortified village of Thiepval from the rear.

==== Battle of Guillemont, 3–6 September ====
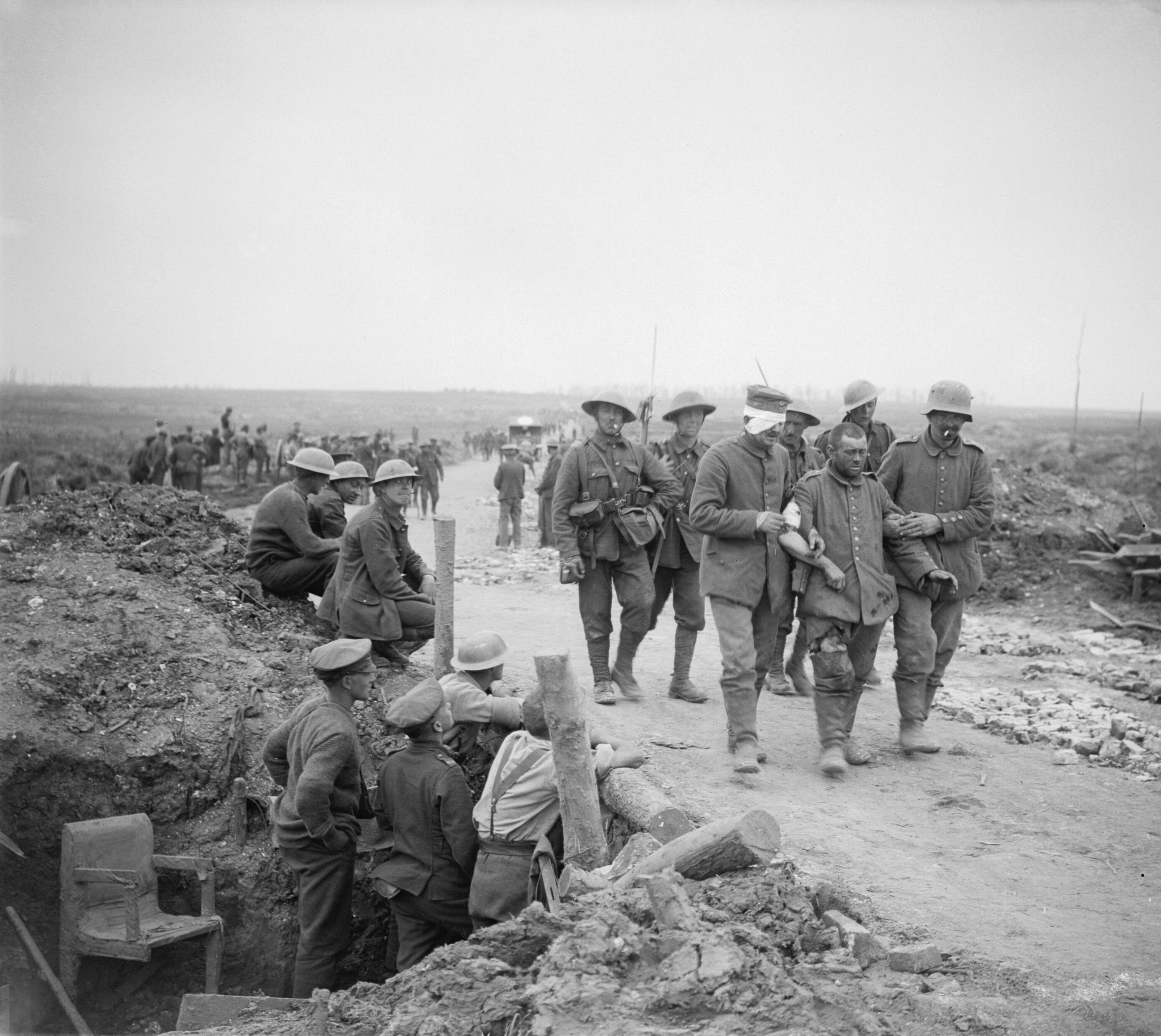
British gunners watching German prisoners passing after the taking of Guillemont, 3 September 1916

The Battle of Guillemont was an attack on the village which was captured by the Fourth Army on the first day. Guillemont was on the right flank of the British sector, near the boundary with the French Sixth Army. German defences ringed the British salient at Delville Wood to the north and had observation over the French Sixth Army area to the south towards the Somme river. The German defence in the area was based on the second line and numerous fortified villages and farms north from Maurepas at Combles, Guillemont, Falfemont Farm, Delville Wood and High Wood, which were mutually supporting. The battle for Guillemont was considered by some observers to be the supreme effort of the German army during the battle. Numerous meetings were held by Joffre, Haig, Foch, General Sir Henry Rawlinson (commander of the British Fourth Army) and Fayolle to co-ordinate joint attacks by the four armies, all of which broke down. A pause in Anglo-French attacks at the end of August, coincided with the largest counter-attack by the German army in the Battle of the Somme.

==== Battle of Ginchy, 9 September ====
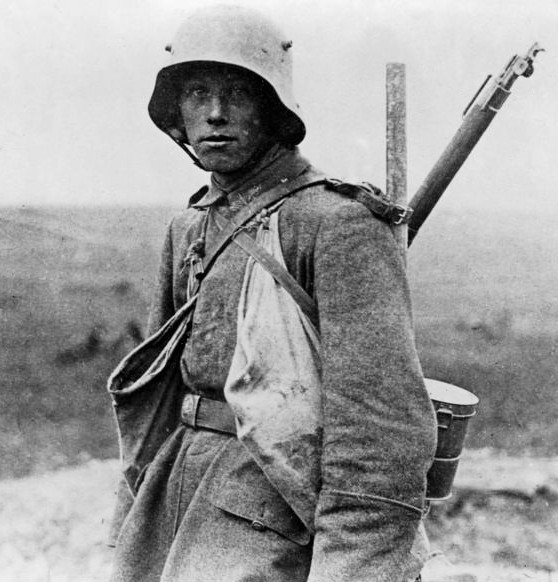
A young German Sommekämpfer in 1916

In the Battle of Ginchy the 16th Division captured the German-held village. Ginchy was 1.5 km (0.93 mi) north-east of Guillemont, at the junction of six roads on a rise overlooking Combles, 4 km (2.5 mi) to the south-east. After the end of the Battle of Guillemont, British troops were required to advance to positions which would give observation over the German third position, ready for a general attack in mid-September. British attacks from Leuze Wood northwards to Ginchy had begun on 3 September, when the 7th Division captured the village and was then forced out by a German counter-attack. The capture of Ginchy and the success of the French Sixth Army on 12 September, in its biggest attack of the battle of the Somme, enabled both armies to make much bigger attacks, sequenced with the Tenth and Reserve armies, which captured much more ground and inflicted c. 130,000 casualties on the German defenders during the month.

=== Third phase: September–November 1916 ===
==== Battle of Flers–Courcelette, 15–22 September ====
The Battle of Flers–Courcelette was the third and final general offensive mounted by the British Army, which attacked an intermediate line and the German third line to take Morval, Lesboeufs and Gueudecourt, which was combined with a French attack on Frégicourt and Rancourt to encircle Combles and a supporting attack on the south bank of the Somme. The strategic objective of a breakthrough was not achieved but the tactical gains were considerable, the front line being advanced by 2,500–3,500 yards (2,300–3,200 m) and many casualties were inflicted on the German defenders. The battle was the debut of the Canadian Corps, the New Zealand Division and tanks of the Heavy Branch of the Machine Gun Corps on the Somme.

==== Battle of Morval, 25–28 September ====
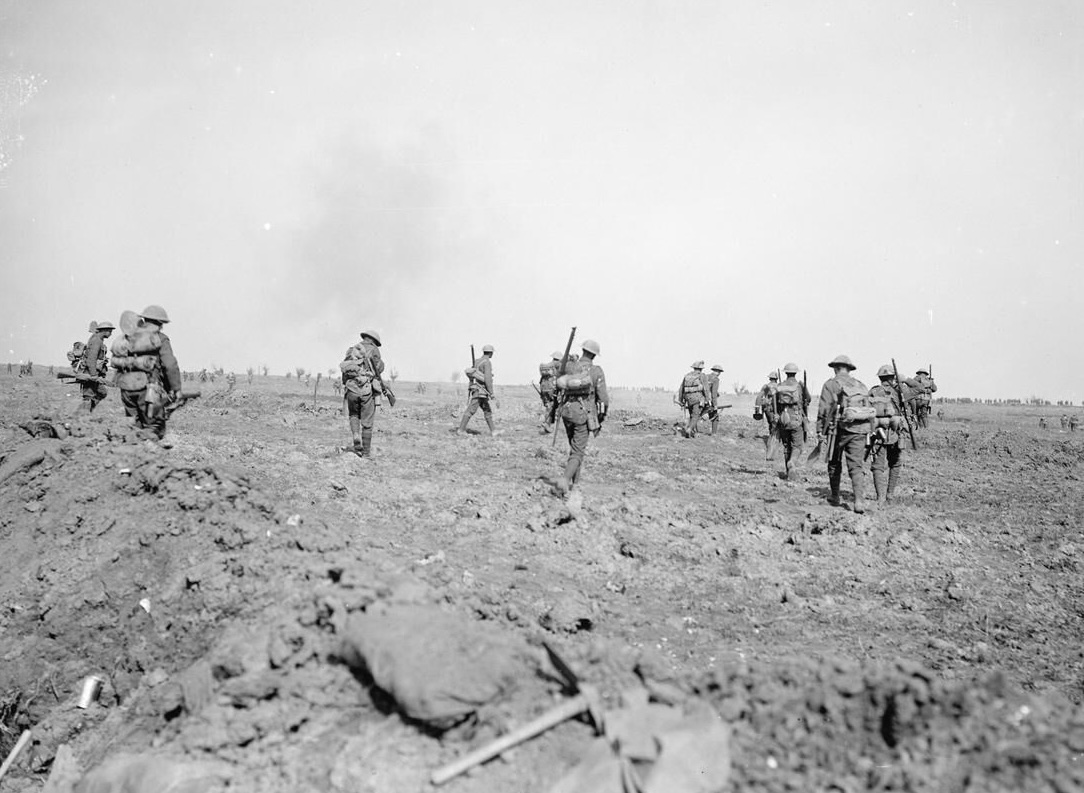
British troops moving up to the attack during the Battle of Morval, 25 September 1916.

The Battle of Morval was an attack by the Fourth Army on Morval, Gueudecourt and Lesboeufs held by the German 1st Army, which had been the final objectives of the Battle of Flers–Courcelette (15–22 September). The attack was postponed to combine with attacks by the French Sixth Army on Combles, south of Morval and because of rain. The combined attack was also intended to deprive the German defenders further west, near Thiepval of reinforcements, before an attack by the Reserve Army, due on 26 September. Combles, Morval, Lesboeufs and Gueudecourt were captured and a small number of tanks joined in the battle later in the afternoon. Many casualties were inflicted on the Germans but the French made slower progress. The Fourth Army advance on 25 September was its deepest since 14 July and left the Germans in severe difficulties, particularly in a Salients, re-entrants and pockets salient near Combles. The Reserve Army attack began on 26 September in the Battle of Thiepval Ridge.

==== Battle of Thiepval Ridge, 26–28 September ====
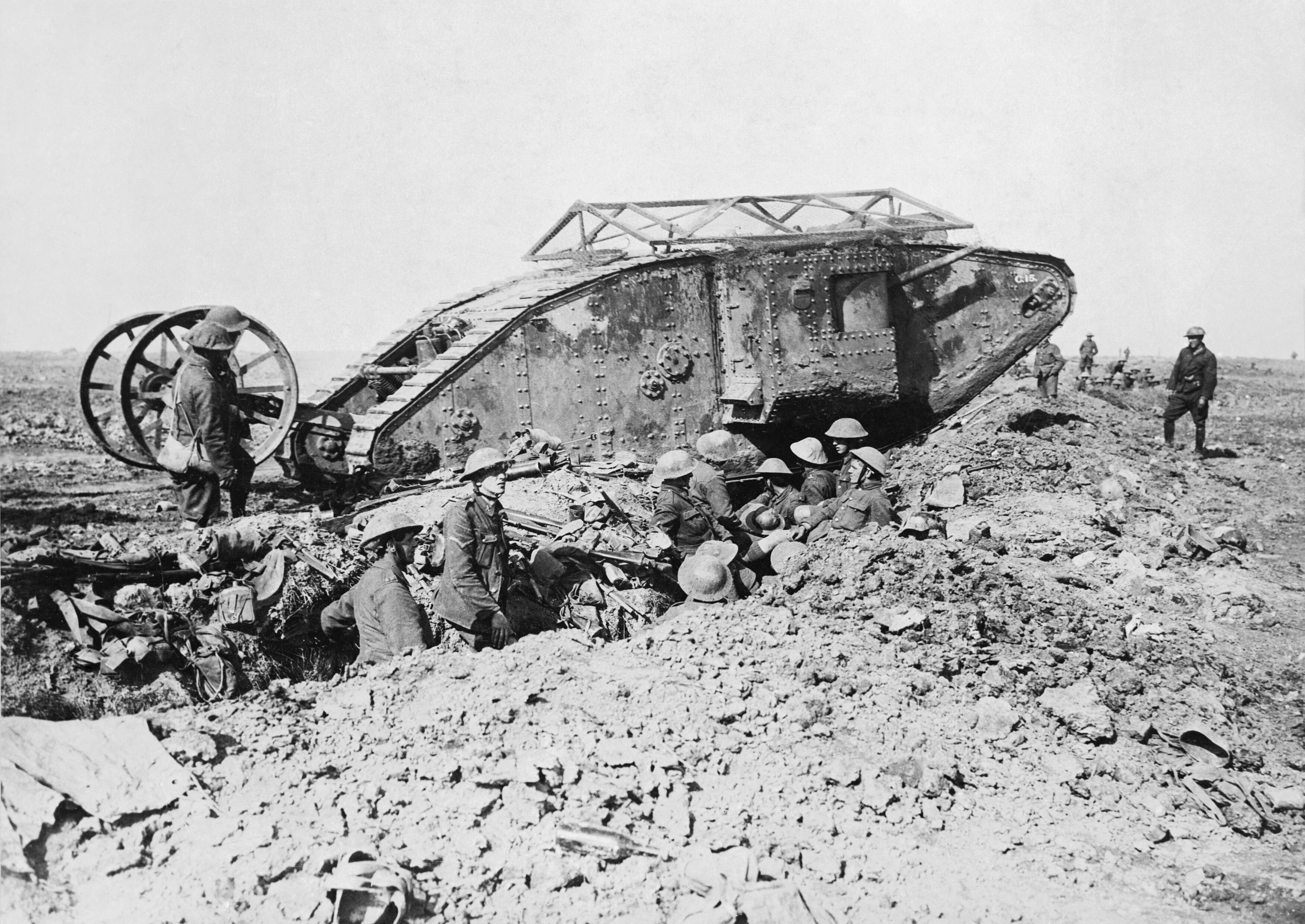
British Mark I male tank near Thiepval, 25 September 1916.

The Battle of Thiepval Ridge was the first large offensive mounted by the Reserve Army of Lieutenant General Hubert Gough and was intended to benefit from the Fourth Army attack at Morval by starting 24 hours afterwards. Thiepval Ridge was well fortified and the German defenders fought with great determination, while the British co-ordination of infantry and artillery declined after the first day, due to confused fighting in the maze of trenches, dug-outs and shell-craters. The final British objectives were not reached until the Battle of the Ancre Heights (1 October – 11 November). Organisational difficulties and deteriorating weather frustrated Joffre's intention to proceed by vigorous co-ordinated attacks by the Anglo-French armies, which became disjointed and declined in effectiveness during late September, at the same time as a revival occurred in the German defence. The British experimented with new techniques in gas warfare, machine-gun bombardment and tank–infantry co-operation, as the Germans struggled to withstand the preponderance of men and material fielded by the Anglo-French, despite reorganisation and substantial reinforcements of troops, artillery and aircraft from Verdun. September became the worst month for casualties for the Germans.

==== Battle of Le Transloy, 1 October – 11 November ====
The Battle of Le Transloy began in good weather and Le Sars was captured on 7 October. Pauses were made from 8–11 October due to rain and 13–18 October to allow time for a methodical bombardment, when it became clear that the German defence had recovered from earlier defeats. Haig consulted with the army commanders and on 17 October reduced the scope of operations by cancelling the Third Army plans and reducing the Reserve Army and Fourth Army attacks to limited operations, in co-operation with the French Sixth Army. Another pause followed before operations resumed on 23 October on the northern flank of the Fourth Army, with a delay during more bad weather on the right flank of the Fourth Army and on the French Sixth Army front, until 5 November. Next day, the Fourth Army ceased offensive operations, except for small attacks intended to improve positions and divert German attention from attacks being made by the Reserve/Fifth Army. Larger operations resumed in January 1917.

==== Battle of the Ancre Heights, 1 October – 11 November ====
The Battle of the Ancre Heights was fought after Haig made plans for the Third Army to take the area east of Gommecourt, the Reserve Army to attack north from Thiepval Ridge and east from Beaumont Hamel–Hébuterne and for the Fourth Army to reach the Péronne–Bapaume road around Le Transloy and Beaulencourt–Thilloy–Loupart Wood, north of the Albert–Bapaume road. The Reserve Army attacked to complete the capture of Regina Trench/Stuff Trench, north of Courcelette to the west end of Bazentin Ridge around Schwaben and Stuff Redoubts, during which bad weather caused great hardship and delay. The Marine Brigade from Flanders and fresh German divisions brought from quiet fronts counter-attacked frequently and the British objectives were not secured until 11 November.

==== Battle of the Ancre, 13–18 November ====
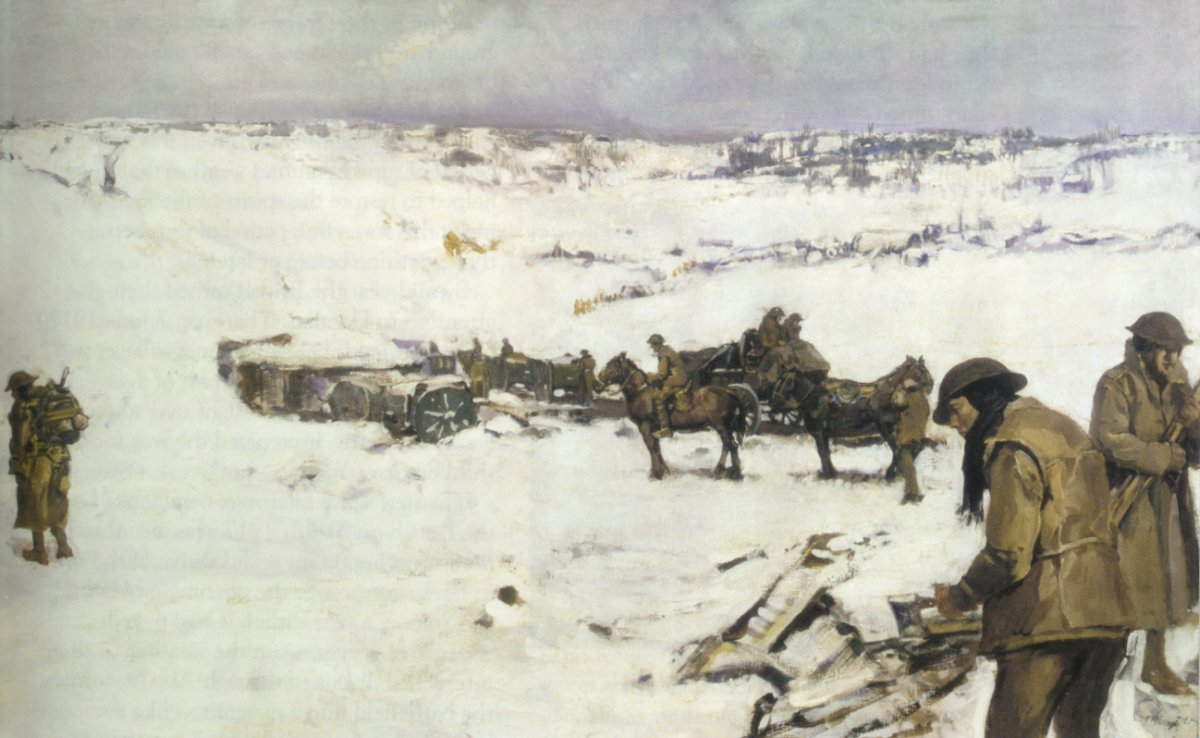
Mametz, Western Front, a winter scene, painting by Frank Crozier

The Battle of the Ancre was the last big British operation of the year. The Fifth (formerly Reserve) Army attacked into the Ancre valley to exploit German exhaustion after the Battle of the Ancre Heights and gain ground ready for a resumption of the offensive in 1917. Political calculation, concern for Allied morale and Joffre's pressure for a continuation of attacks in France, to prevent German troop transfers to Russia and Italy also influenced Haig. The battle began with another mine being detonated beneath Hawthorn Ridge Redoubt. The attack on Serre failed, although a brigade of the 31st Division, which had attacked in the disaster of 1 July, took its objectives before being withdrawn later. South of Serre, Beaumont Hamel and Beaucourt-sur-l'Ancre were captured. South of the Ancre, St. Pierre Division was captured, the outskirts of Grandcourt reached and the Canadian 4th Division captured Regina Trench north of Courcelette, then took Desire Support Trench on 18 November. Until January 1917 a lull set in, as both sides concentrated on enduring the weather.

== Subsequent operations ==
=== Ancre, January–March 1917 ===
After the Battle of the Ancre (13–18 November 1916), British attacks on the Somme front were stopped by the weather and military operations by both sides were mostly restricted to survival in the rain, snow, fog, mud fields, waterlogged trenches and shell-holes. As preparations for the offensive at Arras continued, the British attempted to keep German attention on the Somme front. British operations on the Ancre from 10 January – 22 February 1917, forced the Germans back 5 mi (8.0 km) on a 4 mi (6.4 km) front, ahead of the schedule of the Alberich Bewegung (Alberich Manoeuvre/Operation Alberich) and eventually took 5,284 prisoners. On 22/23 February, the Germans fell back another 3 mi (4.8 km) on a 15 mi (24 km) front. The Germans then withdrew from much of the R. I Stellung to the R. II Stellung on 11 March, forestalling a British attack, which was not noticed by the British until dark on 12 March; the main German withdrawal from the Noyon salient to the Hindenburg Line (Operation Alberich) commenced on schedule on 16 March.

=== Hindenburg Line ===
Von Falkenhayn was sacked and replaced by Hindenburg and Ludendorff at the end of August 1916. At a conference at Cambrai on 5 September, a decision was taken to build a new defensive line well behind the Somme front. The Siegfriedstellung was to be built from Arras to St. Quentin, La Fère and Condé, with another new line between Verdun and Pont-à-Mousson. These lines were intended to limit any Allied breakthrough and to allow the German army to withdraw if attacked; work began on the Siegfriedstellung (Hindenburg Line) at the end of September. Withdrawing to the new line was not an easy decision and the German high command struggled over it during the winter of 1916–1917. Some members wanted to take a shorter step back to a line between Arras and Sailly, while the 1st and 2nd army commanders wanted to stay on the Somme. Generalleutnant von Fuchs on 20 January 1917 said that,

Enemy superiority is so great that we are not in a position either to fix their forces in position or to prevent them from launching an offensive elsewhere. We just do not have the troops.... We cannot prevail in a second battle of the Somme with our men; they cannot achieve that any more. (20 January 1917)

— Hermann von Kuhl

and that half measures were futile, retreating to the Siegfriedstellung was unavoidable. After the loss of a considerable amount of ground around the Ancre valley to the British Fifth Army in February 1917, the German armies on the Somme were ordered on 14 February, to withdraw to reserve lines closer to Bapaume. A further retirement to the Hindenburg Line (Siegfriedstellung) in Operation Alberich began on 16 March 1917, despite the new line being unfinished and poorly sited in some places.

Defensive positions held by the German army on the Somme after November 1916 were in poor condition; the garrisons were exhausted and censors of correspondence reported tiredness and low morale in front-line soldiers. The situation left the German command doubtful that the army could withstand a resumption of the battle. The German defence of the Ancre began to collapse under British attacks, which on 28 January 1917 caused Rupprecht to urge that the retirement to the Siegfriedstellung (Hindenburg Line) begin. Ludendorff rejected the proposal the next day, but British attacks on the First Army – particularly the action of Miraumont (also known as the Battle of Boom Ravine, 17–18 February) – caused Rupprecht on the night of 22 February to order a preliminary withdrawal of c. 4 mi (6.4 km) to the R. I Stellung (R. I Position). On 24 February the Germans withdrew, protected by rear guards, over roads in relatively good condition, which were then destroyed. The German withdrawal was helped by a thaw, which turned roads behind the British front into bogs and by disruption, to the railways, which supplied the Somme front. On the night of 12 March, the Germans withdrew from the R. I Stellung between Bapaume and Achiet le Petit and the British reached the R. II Stellung (R. II Position) on 13 March. The withdrawal took place from 16–20 March, with a retirement of about 25 mi (40 km), giving up more French territory than that gained by the Allies from September 1914 until the beginning of the operation.

== Analysis ==
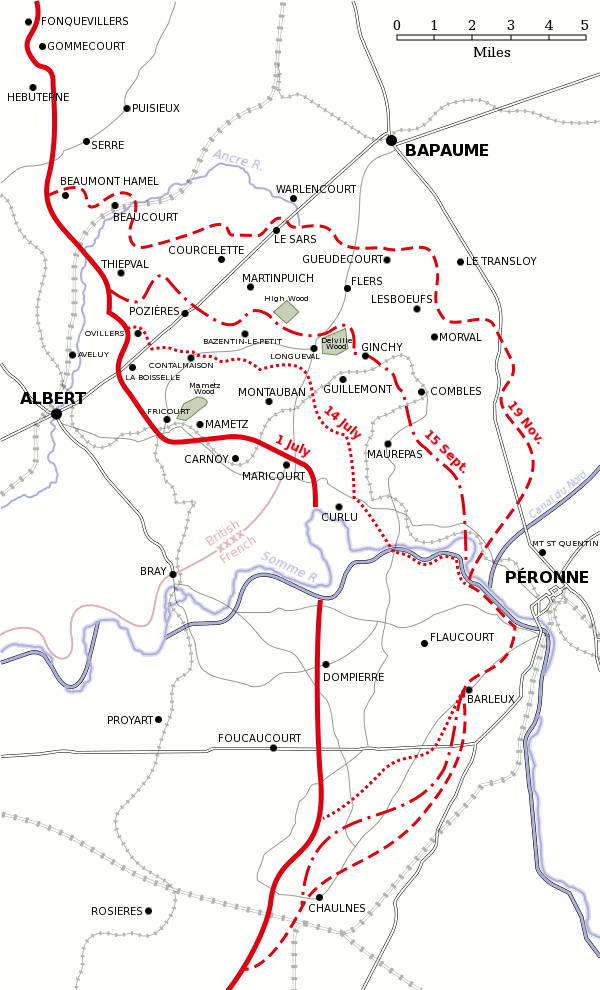
Progress of the Battle of the Somme between 1 July and 18 November.

At the start of 1916, most of the British Army was an inexperienced and patchily trained mass of volunteers. The Somme was a great test for Kitchener's Army, created by Kitchener's call for recruits at the start of the war. The British volunteers were often the fittest, most enthusiastic and best-educated citizens but were inexperienced and it has been claimed that their loss was of lesser military significance than the losses of the remaining peacetime-trained officers and men of the Imperial German Army. British casualties on the first day were the worst in the history of the British Army, with 57,470 casualties, 19,240 of whom were killed.

British survivors of the battle had gained experience and the BEF learned how to conduct the mass industrial warfare which the continental armies had been fighting since 1914. The European powers had begun the war with trained armies of regulars and reservists, which were wasting assets. Crown Prince Rupprecht of Bavaria wrote, "What remained of the old first-class peace-trained German infantry had been expended on the battlefield". A war of attrition was a logical strategy for Britain against Germany, which was also at war with France and Russia. A school of thought holds that the Battle of the Somme placed unprecedented strain on the German army and that after the battle it was unable to replace casualties like-for-like, which reduced it to a militia. Philpott argues that the German army was exhausted by the end of 1916, with loss of morale and the cumulative effects of attrition and frequent defeats causing it to collapse in 1918, a process which began on the Somme, echoing Churchill's argument that the German soldiery was never the same again.

The destruction of German units in battle was made worse by lack of rest. British and French aircraft and long-range guns reached well behind the front line, where trench-digging and other work meant that troops returned to the line exhausted. Despite the strategic predicament of the German army, it survived the battle, withstood the pressure of the Brusilov Offensive and conquered almost all of Romania. In 1917, the German army in the west survived the large British and French offensives of the Nivelle Offensive and the Third Battle of Ypres, though at great cost.

BEF railway tonnage, France 1916
Month	LT
January	2,484
February	2,535
March	2,877
April	3,121
May	3,391
June	4,265
July	4,478
August	4,804
September	4,913
October	5,324
November	5,107
December	5,202

The British and French had advanced about 6 miles (9.7 km) on the Somme, on a front of 16 miles (26 km) at a cost of 419,654 to 432,000 British and about 200,000 French casualties, against 465,181 to 500,000 or perhaps 600,000 German casualties. Until the 1930s the dominant view of the battle in English-language writing was that the battle was a hard-fought victory against a brave, experienced and well-led opponent. Winston Churchill had objected to the way the battle was being fought in August 1916, and Prime Minister David Lloyd George criticised attrition warfare frequently and condemned the battle in his post-war memoirs. In the 1930s a new orthodoxy of "mud, blood and futility" emerged and gained more emphasis in the 1960s when the 50th anniversaries of the Great War battles were commemorated.

=== Transport ===
Until 1916, transport arrangements for the BEF were based on an assumption that the war of movement would soon resume and make it pointless to build infrastructure, since it would be left behind. The British relied on motor transport from railheads which was insufficient where large masses of men and guns were concentrated. When the Fourth Army advance resumed in August, the wisdom of not building light railways which would be left behind was argued by some, in favour of building standard gauge lines. Experience of crossing the beaten zone showed that such lines or metalled roads could not be built quickly enough to sustain an advance, and that pausing while communications caught up allowed the defenders to recover. On the Somme the daily carry during attacks on a 12 mi (19 km) front was 20,000 long tons (20,000 t) and a few wood roads and rail lines were inadequate for the number of lorries and roads. A comprehensive system of transport was needed, which required a much greater diversion of personnel and equipment than had been expected.

=== Casualties ===
British and French casualties July–November 1916
Month	British	French	Sub- total	(% of Allied total)
July	158,786	49,859	208,645	49.4
August	58,085	18,806	76,891	88.4
September	101,313	76,147	177,460	78.9
October	57,722	37,626	95,348	82.3
November	39,784	20,129	59,913	75.0
Total	415,690	202,567	618,257	70.3

Somme casualties
Nationality	No.	Killed & missing	POW
United Kingdom	350,000+	-	-
Canada	24,029	-	-
Australia	23,000		< 200
New Zealand	7,408	-	-
South Africa	3,000+	-	-
Newfoundland	2,000+	-	-
Total Commonwealth	419,654	95,675	-
French	204,253	50,729	-
Allied	623,907	146,404	-
German	237,159	164,055	72,901

The Battle of the Somme was one of the costliest battles of World War I. The original Allied estimate of casualties on the Somme, made at the Chantilly Conference on 15 November 1916, claimed that the Germans suffered 630,000 casualties, exceeding the 485,000 suffered by the British and French. As one German officer wrote,

Somme. The whole history of the world cannot contain a more ghastly word.

— Friedrich Steinbrecher

Modern scholars contend that the Allied figure for German casualties was significantly exaggerated. According to German Reichsarchiv tabulations, all sixty-nine divisions involved on the Somme battlefield suffered a total of 237,159 casualties of all types. These numbers are verified by what the official Australian historian, Bean, calculated.

Churchill wrote that Allied casualties had exceeded German losses. In The World Crisis (first published in the early 1920s, reprinted in 1938), he quoted the German Reichsarchiv data, showing that on the Western Front between February and June 1916, the Germans had suffered 270,000 casualties against the French and 390,000 between July and the end of the year (Appendix J); he wrote that the Germans suffered 278,000 casualties at Verdun and that around one eighth of their casualties were suffered on "quiet" sectors. According to the tables, between July and October 1916, German forces on the Western Front suffered 537,919 casualties, 288,011 inflicted by the French and 249,908 by the British; German forces inflicted 794,238 casualties on the Entente.

In 1931, Hermann Wendt published a comparison of German and British–French casualties which showed an average of 30 per cent more Allied casualties than German losses on the Somme. In the first 1916 volume of the British Official History (1932), J. E. Edmonds wrote that comparisons of casualties were inexact, because of different methods of calculation by the belligerents but that British casualties were 419,654, from total British casualties in France in the period of 498,054. French Somme casualties were 194,451 and German casualties were c. 445,322, to which should be added 27 per cent for woundings, which would have been counted as casualties using British criteria; Anglo-French casualties on the Somme were over 600,000 and German casualties were under 600,000. In the second 1916 volume of the British Official History (1938), Wilfrid Miles wrote that German casualties were 660,000–680,000 and Anglo-French casualties were just under 630,000, using "fresh data" from the French and German official accounts.

The addition by Edmonds of c. 30 per cent to German figures, supposedly to make them comparable to British criteria, was criticised as "spurious" by M. J. Williams in 1964. McRandle and Quirk in 2006 cast doubt on the Edmonds calculations but counted 729,000 German casualties on the Western Front from July to December against 631,000 by Churchill, concluding that there had been fewer German losses than Anglo-French casualties but that the ability of the German army to inflict disproportionate losses had been eroded by attrition. In 2003 British historian Gary Sheffield wrote that the calculation by Edmonds of Anglo-French casualties was correct but the one for German casualties was discredited, quoting the official German figure of 500,000 casualties.

Western Front casualties July–December 1916
Month	No.
July	196,081
August	75,249
September	115,056
October	66,852
November	46,238
December	13,803
Total; British	513,289
French	c. 434,000
Total: Anglo-French	c. 947,289
German	c. 719,000
Grand total	c. 1,666,289

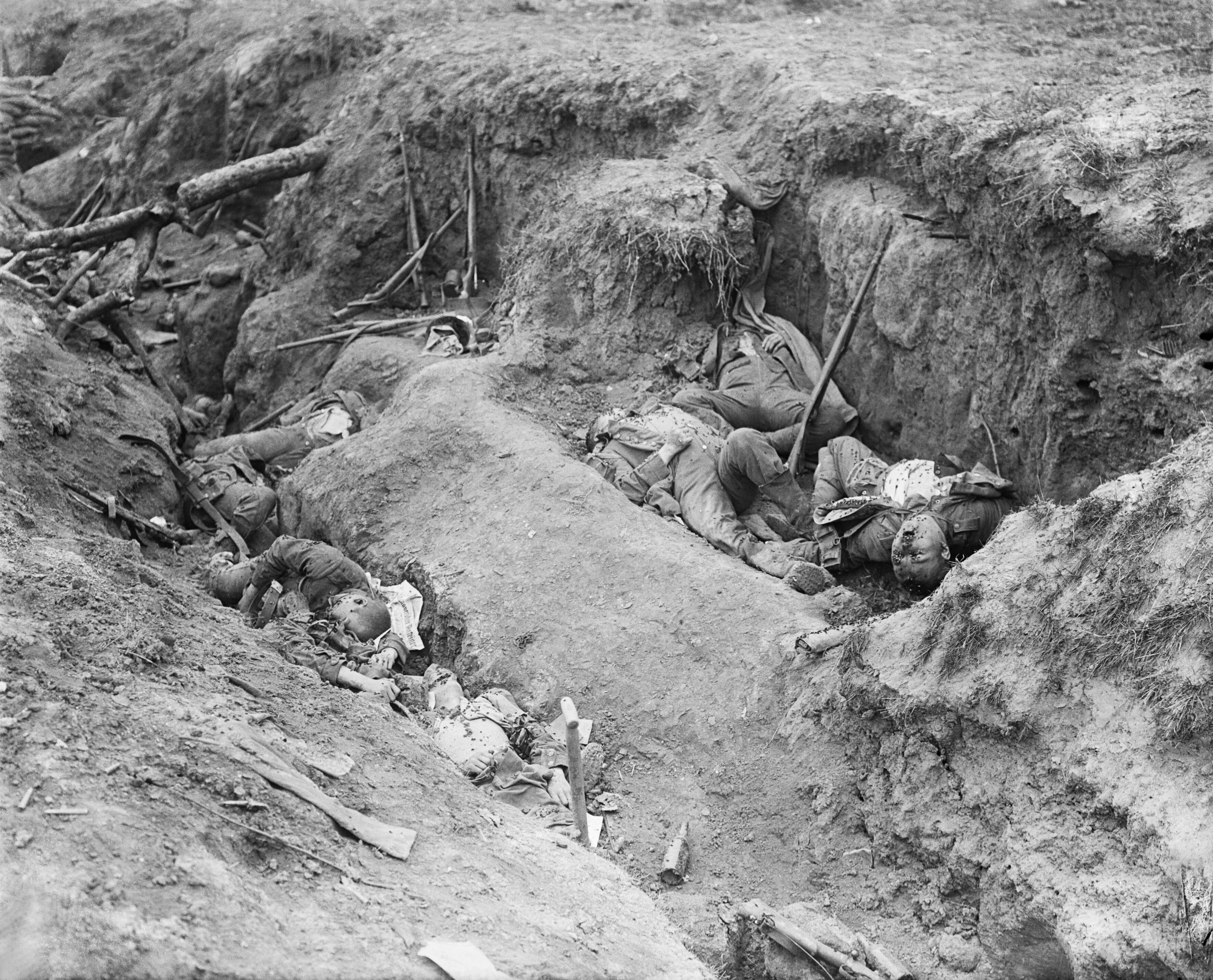
Dead German soldiers in a captured German trench near Ginchy, August 1916

Doughty wrote that French losses on the Somme were "surprisingly high" at 202,567 men, 54 per cent of the 377,231 casualties at Verdun. Prior and Wilson used Churchill's research and wrote that the British suffered 420,000 casualties from 1 July to mid-November (c. 3,600 per day) in inflicting c. 280,000 German casualties and offer no figures for French casualties or the losses they inflicted on the Germans. Sheldon wrote that the British lost "over 400,000" casualties. Harris wrote that British losses were c. 420,000, French casualties were over 200,000 men and German losses were c. 500,000, according to the "best" German sources. Sheffield wrote that the losses were "appalling", with 419,000 British casualties, c. 204,000 French and perhaps 600,000 German casualties.

In a commentary on the debate about Somme casualties, Philpott used Miles's figures of 419,654 British casualties and the French official figures of 154,446 Sixth Army losses and 48,131 Tenth Army casualties. Philpott described German losses as "disputed", with estimates ranging from 400,000 to 680,000. The high Allied casualties of July 1916 are not representative of the way attrition turned in the Allies' favour in September, although this was not sustained as the weather deteriorated. (Note: Philpott writes of Churchill's "snapshot of July 1916". It is not entirely clear what he means by this. He may be referring to the paper which Churchill distributed in August 1916, rather than the fuller numbers later presented in The World Crisis.) Philpott quoted Robin Prior (in Churchill's World Crisis As History [1983]) that the "blood test" is a crude measure compared to manpower reserves, industrial capacity, farm productivity and financial resources and that intangible factors were more influential on the course of the war, which the Allies won despite "losing" the purely quantitative test.

== Commemoration ==
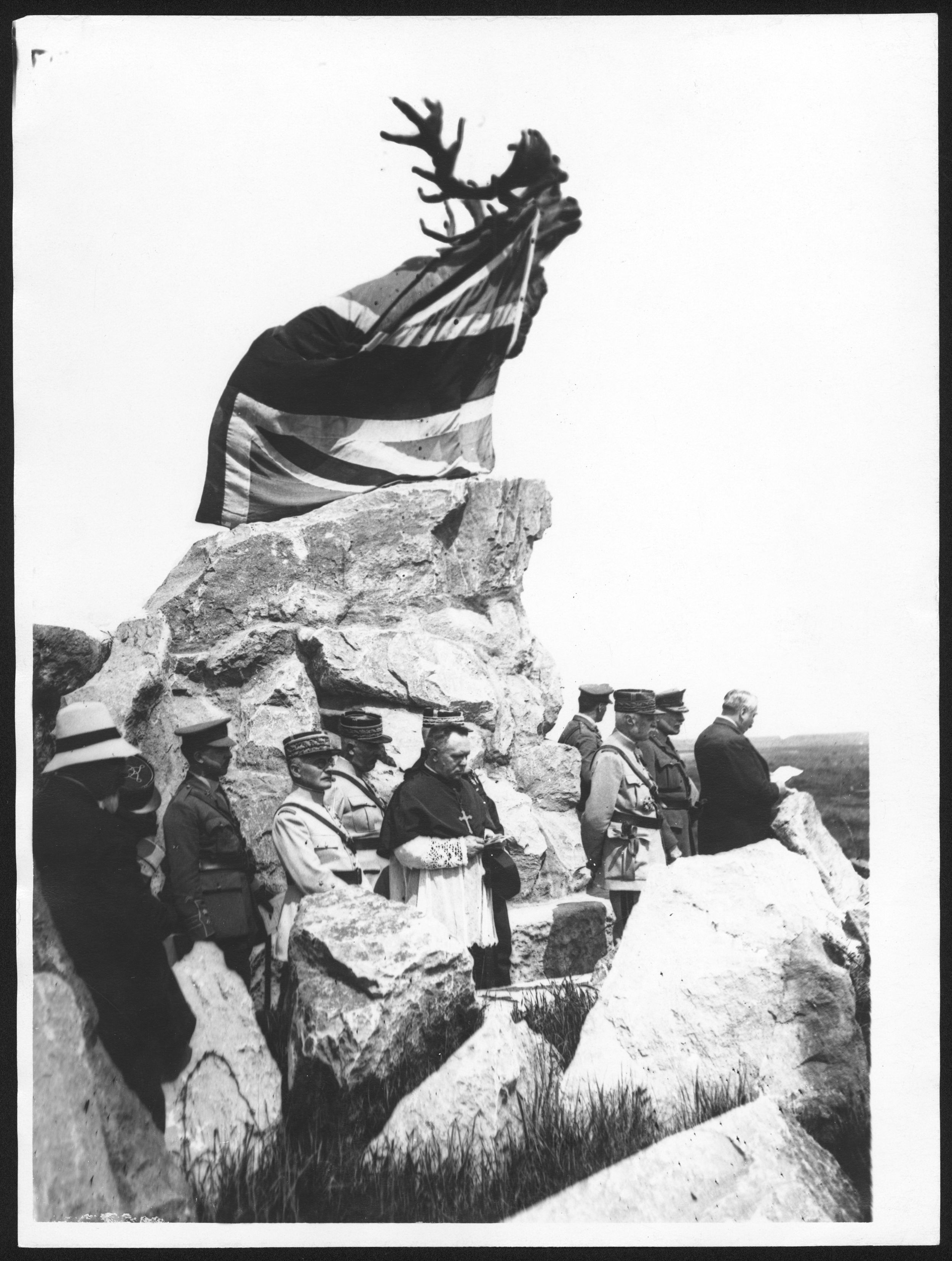
Newfoundland War Memorial in Beaumont-Hamel

In the United Kingdom and Newfoundland, the Battle of the Somme became the central memory of World War I. The Royal British Legion with the British Embassy in Paris and the Commonwealth War Graves Commission commemorate the battle on 1 July each year, at the Thiepval Memorial to the Missing of the Somme. For their efforts on the first day of the battle, the 1st Newfoundland Regiment was given the name "The Royal Newfoundland Regiment" by George V on 28 November 1917. The first day of the Battle of the Somme is commemorated in Newfoundland, remembering the "Best of the Best" at 11 am on the Sunday nearest to 1 July. The Somme is remembered in Northern Ireland due to the participation of the 36th (Ulster) Division and commemorated by veterans' groups and by unionist/Protestant groups such as the Orange Order. The Royal British Legion and others commemorate the battle on 1 July.

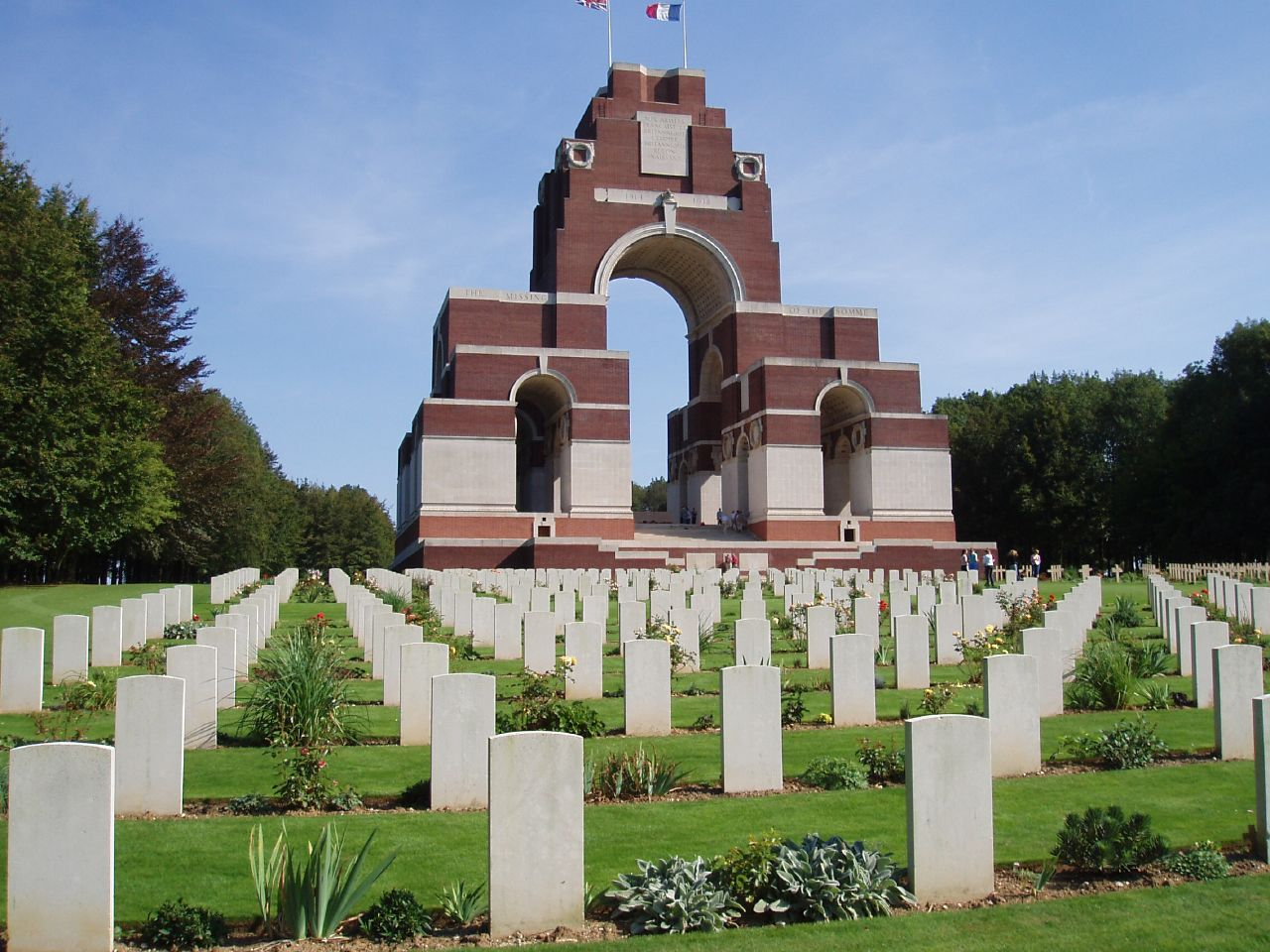
Thiepval Memorial to the British Missing of the Somme

On 1 July 2016, at 7:28 a.m. British Summer Time, the UK observed a two minute silence to mark the start of the battle which began 100 years earlier. A special ceremony was broadcast on BBC1 and all BBC radio stations participated in the silence. At the start of the silence, the King's Troop, Royal Horse Artillery fired a gun every four seconds for one hundred seconds and a whistle was blown to end it. Just like a Remembrance Sunday silence, a bugler played The Last Post after the silence. The silence was announced during a speech by the Prime Minister David Cameron who said, "There will be a national two-minute silence on Friday morning. I will be attending a service at the Thiepval Memorial near the battlefield and it's right that the whole country pauses to remember the sacrifices of all those who fought and lost their lives in that conflict." On 1 July 2016, a ceremony was held in Heaton Park in north Manchester in England, which was the site of a large army training camp during the war, and the Catholic Bishops of England and Wales suggested that churches conduct a Requiem Mass for the dead of the battle on the same day.

In Britain on 1 July 2016, 1,400 actors dressed in replica Great War British Army uniforms, walked about in streets and public open areas, from 7:00 a.m. to 7:00 p.m. Each took on temporarily the identity of a British soldier who died on the first day of the Somme and handed out information cards about that soldier. They did not talk, except for occasionally singing "We're here because we're here" to the tune of Auld Lang Syne. This event was called "Ghost Soldiers".

== Histories of the battle ==
The Battle of the Somme has been called the beginning of modern all-arms warfare, during which Kitchener's Army learned to fight the mass-industrial war in which the continental armies had been engaged for two years. This view sees the British contribution to the battle as part of a coalition war and part of a process, which took the strategic initiative from the German Army and caused it irreparable damage, leading to its collapse in late 1918.

Haig and General Rawlinson have been criticised ever since 1916 for the human cost of the battle and for failing to achieve their territorial objectives. On 1 August 1916, Churchill, then out of ministerial office, criticised the British Army's conduct of the offensive to the British Cabinet, claiming that though the battle had forced the Germans to end their offensive at Verdun, attrition was damaging the British armies more than the German armies. Though Churchill was unable to suggest an alternative, a critical view of the British on the Somme has been influential in English-language writing ever since. In 2016, historian Peter Barton argued in a series of three television programmes that the Battle of the Somme should be regarded as a German defensive victory.

John Terraine, Gary Sheffield, Christopher Duffy, Roger Chickering, Holger Herwig, William Philpott et al. wrote that there was no strategic alternative for the British in 1916 and that an understandable horror at British losses is insular, given the millions of casualties borne by the French and Russian armies since 1914. This school of thought sets the battle in a context of a general Allied offensive in 1916 and notes that German and French writing on the battle puts it in a continental perspective. Little German and French writing on this topic has been translated, leaving much of their historical perspective and detail of German and French military operations inaccessible to the English-speaking world.

== See also ==
- List of Canadian battles during the First World War
- List of World War I memorials and cemeteries in the Somme
- Order of battle for the Battle of the Somme
