= Roger Chickering =

American historian of the German Empire and World War I

- Occupations: Historian, author
- Writing career
- Notable works: The Great War and Urban Life in Germany: Freiburg, 1914-1918
- Website: www9.georgetown.edu/faculty/chickerr/

Roger Chickering is an American historian of the German Empire and World War I. He was a professor at Georgetown University, retiring in 2010.

== Education ==
After taking his undergraduate degree in history at Cornell University, Chickering received his doctorate in 1968 at Stanford University, where he studied with Gordon A. Craig. Imperial Germany and a World Without War: The Peace Movement and German Society, 1892-1914, published in 1975, was based on his dissertation.

== Career ==
- Professor of history, BMW Center for German and European Studies (Joint Appointment in the Department of History), Georgetown University, 1993-2010
- Research fellow, Wissenschaftskolleg zu Berlin, 2008-2009
- Research fellow, National Humanities Center, Research Triangle Park, NC
- Research fellow, Woodrow Wilson International Center for Scholars, Washington, DC, 1996–97
- Professor of history, University of Oregon, 1981–94
- Visiting research fellow, Militärgeschichtliches Forschungsamt, Freiburg i. Br., 1991–92
- Member, School of Historical Studies, Institute for Advanced Study, Princeton, New Jersey, Spring Semester 1991
- Visiting research fellow, Institut für neuere Geschichte, Ludwig-Maximilians-Universität München, Munich, 1984–85
- Visiting research fellow, Friedrich-Meinecke Institut, Free University of Berlin, 1976–77
- Associate professor of history, University of Oregon, 1974–81
- Assistant professor of history, University of Oregon, 1968–74
- Instructor of history, Stanford University, 1967–68

Chickering retired from Georgetown University in 2010. While he began his career as a historian focusing on the German Empire, his interests increasingly migrated to the First World War. During his career, he published multiple monographs, edited volumes, and articles.

== Selected publications ==
- The German Empire, 1871–1918. Cambridge UP, 2025.
- War in an age of revolution, 1775-1815. German Historical Institute. 2010. OCLC 429025603.
- Freiburg im Ersten Weltkrieg: Totaler Krieg und städtischer Alltag 1914-1918. Schoeningh Verlag, 2009.
- The Great War and Urban Life in Germany: Freiburg, 1914-1918. Cambridge UP, 2007.
- A world at total war: global conflict and the politics of destruction, 1937-1945. German Historical Institute. 2005. OCLC 54852979.
- Imperial Germany and the Great War, 1914-1918. 2d ed. Cambridge UP, 2004
- Karl Lamprecht: A German Academic Life (1856–1915). New Jersey: Humanities Press, 1993.
- Karl Lamprecht. Leben eines deutschen Historikers 1856-1915] Stuttgart: Franz Steiner Verlag, 2021.
- We Men Who Feel Most German: A Cultural Study of the Pan-German League, 1886-1914. Boston: Allen & Unwin, 1984.
- Imperial Germany and a World Without War: The Peace Movement and German Society, 1892-1914. Princeton, N.J: Princeton University Press, 1975.
- "The Reichsbanner and the Weimar Republic, 1924-26," The Journal of Modern History Vol. 40, No. 4, December 1968.
