= SECR K and SR K1 classes =

Former class of English locomotives

SECR K & SR K1 (River) classes
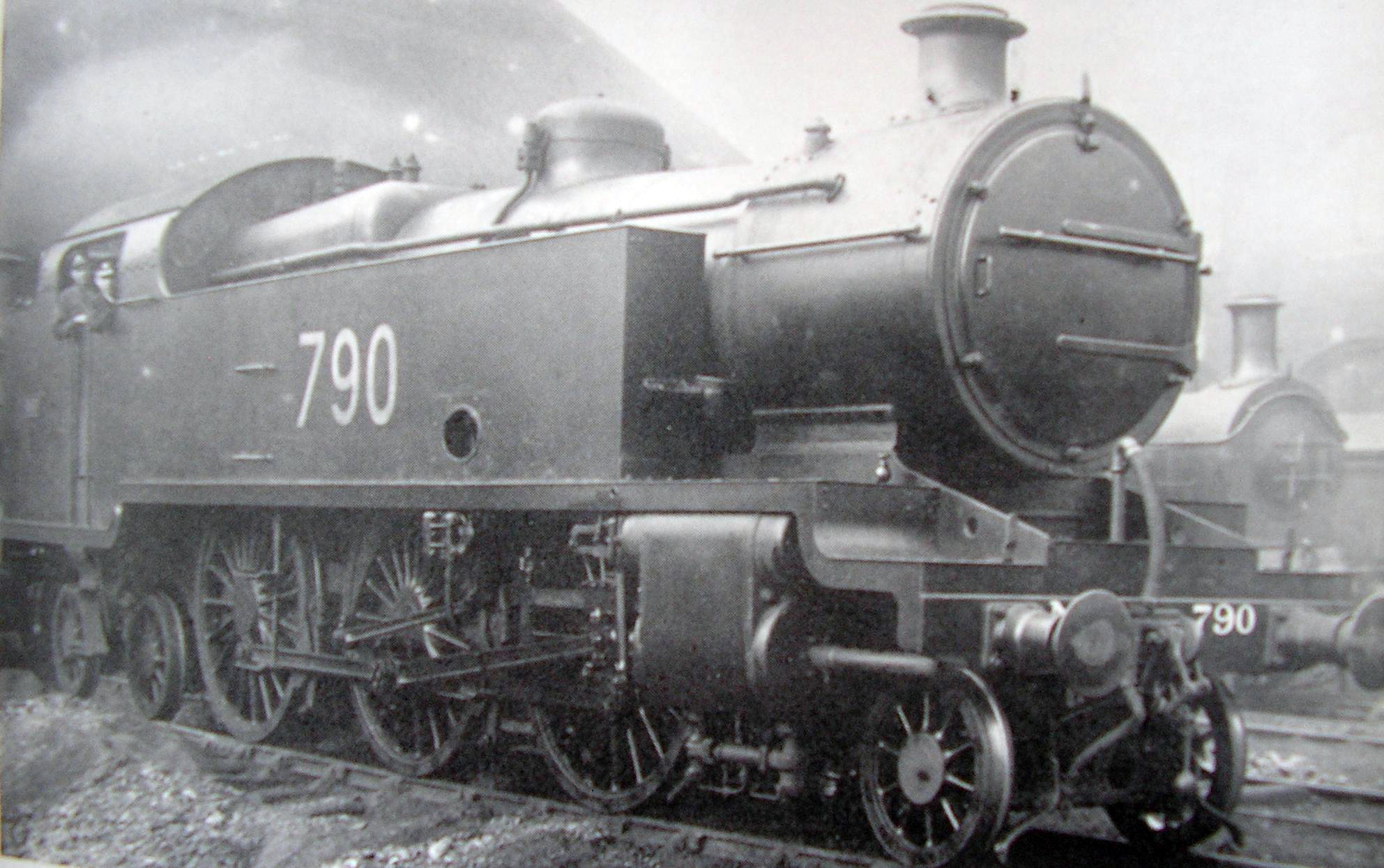
- The prototype K class No. 790 (later named River Avon) under SECR ownership. The class was named after rivers flowing within the Southern Railway's operating area.
Type and origin
- Power type: Steam
- Designer: Richard Maunsell
- Builder: K: Ashford Works (1); Brighton Works (10); Armstrong Whitworth (9); K1: Ashford Works (1)
- Build date: 1917, 1925–1926
- Total produced: K: 20; K1: 1
Specifications
- Configuration
  - Whyte: 2-6-4T
  - UIC: K: 1′C2′ h2tS; K1: 1′C2′ h3tS
- Gauge: 4 ft 8 1/2 in (1,435 mm) standard gauge
- Leading dia.: 3 ft 1 in (0.940 m)
- Driver dia.: 6 ft 0 in (1.829 m)
- Trailing dia.: 3 ft 1 in (0.940 m)
- Wheelbase: 35 ft 10 in (10.922 m)
- Length: 43 ft 6 1/4 in (13.265 m)
- Height: 12 ft 11 3/8 in (3.947 m)
- Axle load: K: 18.50 long tons (18.80 t; 20.72 short tons)
- Adhesive weight: K: 52.75 long tons (53.60 t; 59.08 short tons)
- Loco weight: K: 82.75 long tons (84.08 t; 92.68 short tons) (790 only); K: 84 long tons (85 t; 94 short tons) (A791-A809); K1: 88.75 long tons (90.17 t; 99.40 short tons)
- Fuel type: Coal
- Fuel capacity: 2.50 long tons (2.54 t; 2.80 short tons)
- Water cap.: 2,000 imp gal (9,100 L; 2,400 US gal)
- Boiler pressure: 200 lbf/in^{2} (13.79 bar; 1.38 MPa)
- Cylinders: K: Two, outside; K1: Three
- Cylinder size: K: 19 in × 28 in (483 mm × 711 mm); K1: 16 in × 28 in (406 mm × 711 mm)
- Valve gear: K: Walschaerts; K1 (outside): Walschaerts (inside): Holcroft
Performance figures
- Tractive effort: K: 23,866 lbf (106.161 kN); K1: 25,387 lbf (112.927 kN)
Career
- Operators: South Eastern and Chatham Railway; → Southern Railway
- Class: K and K1 classes
- Numbers: K: 790–809; K1: 890
- Official name: River class
- Nicknames: Rolling Rivers
- Withdrawn: 1927
- Disposition: All rebuilt to U or U1 class — One rebuild surviving

The SECR K class was a type of 2-6-4 tank locomotive designed in 1914 by Richard Maunsell for express passenger duties on the South Eastern and Chatham Railway (SECR), which operated between London and south-east England. The Southern Railway (SR) K1 class was a three-cylinder variant of the K class, designed in 1925 to suit a narrower loading gauge. They were among the first non-Great Western Railway (GWR) types to use and improve upon the basic design principles of power and standardisation established by GWR Chief Mechanical Engineer (CME) George Jackson Churchward. The locomotives were based on the GWR 4300 class, improved by the Midland Railway's ideals of simplicity and ease of maintenance.

The K class was designed to be mechanically similar to the SECR N class 2-6-0 mixed-traffic locomotives. The class was one of the earliest to use the 2-6-4 wheel arrangement in Britain. Production began towards the end of the First World War, and the prototype rolled out of Ashford Works three years after design work was completed due to wartime production constraints. The class replaced obsolete 4-4-0 passenger locomotives in an SECR fleet standardisation programme.

Twenty-one locomotives were built: twenty K class (two cylinders) and one K1 class (three cylinders), the first in 1917 and the remainder between 1925 and 1926. They operated over the Eastern section of the Southern Railway network and were given the names of rivers, being referred as the River class from 1925. Crews referred to the K and K1 classes as "Rolling Rivers" because of their instability when travelling at speed. They were rebuilt as 2-cylinder SR U class and 3-cylinder SR U1 class 2-6-0s (respectively) following a railway accident at Sevenoaks, Kent in 1927. They continued in service with British Railways (BR) until the last was withdrawn in 1966. One K class rebuild (No. 31806) used to be preserved on the Mid Hants Railway, but since 2014, it is now preserved on the Swanage Railway in Dorset and still operational today.

== Background ==
Three factors dictated the type of locomotive that could operate on the South Eastern and Chatham Railway (SECR): the heavy passenger train loadings; the poor track quality; and the weak, lightly built bridges. On the lines of the former London, Chatham and Dover Railway (LCDR) – inherited by the SECR in 1899 – beach pebbles had been used for ballast instead of conventional ballast, which has irregular shapes that lock together to keep the track in place. These economies in construction meant that only locomotives with low axle loadings could operate safely over the track. The SECR was therefore unable to follow a coherent strategy to reduce the number of locomotive types inherited from the two constituent railways. Despite increased passenger and freight traffic between London Charing Cross and the Kentish coast during the first decades of the 20th century, the Operating Department had to use mismatched classes of underpowered and obsolete 4-4-0 and 0-6-0 locomotives, which could operate within the restrictions imposed by the infrastructure. This resulted in frequent double-heading, adding to operational costs.

Richard Maunsell was appointed CME of the SECR in 1913, following the enforced retirement of Harry Wainwright, who had left a range of competent but unspectacular locomotive classes that struggled to cope with the increased train lengths and loadings. Maunsell reviewed the situation and planned to introduce six standard classes – using only two boiler designs – which would work the entire traffic of the railway. The first of these was the N class 2-6-0, which gave the SECR a capable mixed-traffic locomotive. For the express passenger design that could cope with the heavy boat trains, Maunsell wanted to enlarge the existing L class 4-4-0 with Walschaerts valve gear and an enlarged superheater, but this design would have resulted in a too heavy axle loading. Maunsell's newly recruited assistants, G.H. Pearson and Harold Holcroft from the Great Western Railway at Swindon and James Clayton from the Midland Railway at Derby, had recently been involved in the design of large passenger tank engines and persuaded him to use the 2-6-4 wheel arrangement, which would allow the class to operate at high speeds on the poor-quality track in north Kent.

== Design and construction ==
The 2-6-4 wheel arrangement was not in common use in Great Britain at this time, as many railway companies operated routes that required locomotives with greater fuel capacity, or short branch lines that necessitated smaller locomotives. The 2-6-4 tank engine design had only been used once before for standard gauge locomotives in Britain, on the Great Central Railway's 1B class freight locomotives of 1914. However, the configuration was ideal for the SECR, because of its shorter mainlines, and allowed for a long wheelbase with a leading axle to permit greater stability at speed on track curves. The tightness of the curves on the former LCDR mainlines had constrained the size of locomotives operating on the SECR, as they had been hastily erected during the nineteenth century to compete with those of the South Eastern Railway (SER). The longer locomotive could also accommodate a larger boiler than a 4-4-0, giving sufficient power to avoid double-heading of locomotives on heavier trains.

The K class design used a "Bissel bogie" leading axle and a plain trailing bogie. The trailing bogie permitted the use of a large coal bunker that was capable of sustaining the locomotive over the run between London Charing Cross and Dover Marine, and side water tanks of 2,000 imp gal (9,100 L; 2,400 US gal) capacity were used, negating the need for a tender. The coupled wheelbase between the rear and centre driving wheels was reduced from that used on the mechanically identical N class to 7 ft 9 in (2.362 m) to accommodate the bogie. The cab was fully enclosed, although the set of four small front spectacle plates (the windows on the front face of the cab for forward visibility) were the same as those used on the N class.

The K class was designed by Maunsell's team in 1914 as part of his proposed standardisation programme following the N class, but the designs were not shown to the railway directors until early 1915 to enable all six designs to be shown at once. The design incorporated the principles of power and reliability established by George Churchward, using a Belpaire firebox that sloped downwards towards the cab instead of a round-topped version, a regulator located in the smokebox, long-travel valves for free running at high speeds, a sharply tapered and domeless boiler, and a right-hand driving position. The inclusion of these features is attributed to Holcroft, Maunsell's personal assistant, who had worked on the GWR 4300 class and the N class. James Clayton, Maunsell's Chief Locomotive Draughtsman, brought simpler and more functional Midland Railway influences to the design, such as the shape of the cab and the drumhead-type smokebox, which sat on a saddle that was of wider diameter than the fully lagged and clad boiler. The latter was fitted with Ross pop safety valves and pressed to 200 psi (1.38 MPa).

Other innovations by Maunsell's team included greater superheating surface area, locating the boiler water top feed inside a dome-like cover with external clackboxes and water feed pipes mounted on either side, outside Walschaerts valve gear, and parts that could be shared with similar locomotive classes to reduce maintenance costs. The firebox was narrower towards the rear and featured a continuously sloping grate, whilst the ashpan was fitted with front and rear damper doors, the latter adjusted to clear the rear driving axle. The lower part of the coal bunker incorporated a water tank of 760 imp gal (3,500 L; 910 US gal) capacity. This was connected to two 620 imp gal (2,800 L; 740 US gal) side tanks by two rectangular pipes on either side of the locomotive that also formed supports for the cab footplate.

=== K class ===
In January 1915 Maunsell received authority to build six examples, but, as with the N class, production was delayed due to the use of the Ashford works for wartime armaments manufacture. Assembly began in 1917 and the first, No. 790, emerged in July of that year. It was based at Bricklayers Arms depot, preceding the earlier N class design into service by one month. Further construction was deferred until after Ashford had caught up with the maintenance backlog caused by the war.

Ten more locomotives were ordered by the SECR from Ashford works in June 1920, and to speed delivery the construction of frames, cylinders and side tanks was subcontracted to the Royal Arsenal at Woolwich. However, further severe delays at Ashford caused by the backlog of repair work meant that the boilers had to be supplied by the North British Locomotive Company. Construction of these locomotives had not begun by 1 January 1923, when the Railways Act 1921 merged the SECR with other railways in southern England to form the Southern Railway.

Maunsell was appointed CME of the newly formed Southern Railway in 1923, and inherited the 1920 SECR order for ten K class locomotives. The order was still outstanding in 1924, although most of the component parts had been made. On 14 January 1925, Maunsell ordered No. 790 to be overhauled and trialled on the Central section. As the locomotive proved suitable for the operating conditions of this section, the Southern Railway's Locomotive Committee proceeded with the assembly of the K class parts using outside contractors. Nine sets of parts (Nos. A791–A799) were conveyed to Armstrong Whitworth for assembly and the finished locomotives delivered in May and June 1925. These were dual-fitted with vacuum and Westinghouse (air) brakes for use with the former London, Brighton and South Coast Railway (LBSCR) rolling stock on the Central section. Other differences from the prototype included the relocation of the regulator to the dome and an increase in superheater area. The tenth set of parts was retained by Ashford and used for the first member of the K1 class later that year.

In May 1925 Maunsell ordered a further ten locomotives from Brighton works (Nos. A800–A809), which only had vacuum brakes for the SECR stock on the Eastern section. They were delivered between July and December 1926. This group had modified suspension on the bogie and leading axle, in an attempt to address complaints from the crews of rough riding experienced with earlier members of the class. A further 20 members of the class were ordered in March 1926 (ten each from Ashford and Brighton works), despite strong reservations expressed by the Operating Department concerning "the wisdom or desirability of placing so many large passenger tanks in service". These were allocated the numbers A610–A629, and work had begun on building the frames and cylinders when the order was cancelled following an accident at Sevenoaks in 1927 involving locomotive No. A800. These numbers were later allocated to the first production batch of U class locomotives.

=== K1 class ===
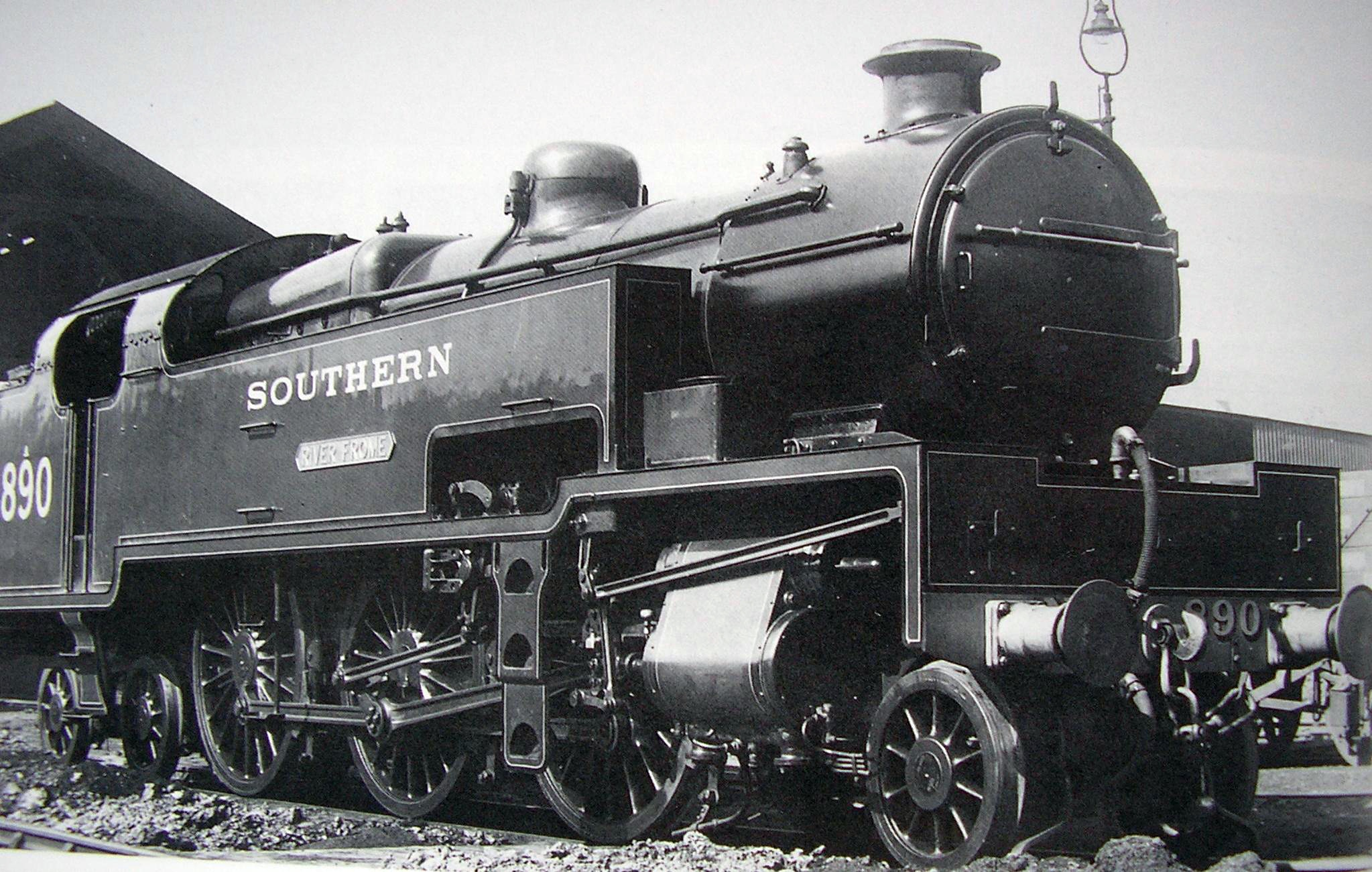
The prototype K1 class No. A890 River Frome, pictured at Bricklayers Arms shed in July 1927. Note the flat cover above the buffers. Above the right-hand cylinder is the Holcroft valve gear linkage to the inside cylinder.

In August 1919, a proposal was put to the SECR's Locomotive, Carriage and Wagon Committee for 2 and 3-cylinder tank engines of 2-8-0 wheel arrangement for heavy shunting of freight wagons. They were to use the same boiler as the K and N classes and the general layout was similar to designs used by the GWR in South Wales. Nothing came of this proposal because of other commitments and the absorption of the SECR into the Southern Railway. In 1922, Holcroft suggested that 3-cylinder 2-6-0 tender locomotives with 6 ft (1,830 mm) driving wheels should be built instead of tank locomotives. Despite the benefit of a greater operational range, Holcroft's immediate superior, Clayton, refused to pass this suggestion on to Maunsell. The 3-cylinder principle was therefore applied to the K class.

At the Southern Railway's January 1925 Locomotive Committee meeting, when it was decided to use outside contractors to build the K class, Maunsell received authority to retain one set of parts at Ashford works to construct a prototype 3-cylinder 2-6-4 tank. The modification was based upon that used on N class No. 822 to produce a 3-cylinder locomotive in 1922, although it retained the 6 ft (1,830 mm) driving wheels and shorter wheelbase of the K class. The modification was the inclusion of an additional (inside) cylinder between the frames, and a crank axle was fitted to the middle driving wheels. The axle was connected to the inside cylinder assembly by a connecting rod inclined at 1 in 8 to clear the front driving axle. This arrangement was supplemented by two smaller-diameter outside cylinders with 16 in (406 mm) bore (compared to the 19 in (483 mm) cylinders of the K class), and a greater chimney diameter. The resulting prototype 3-cylinder "K1" was narrower than the K class and hence could work on routes with restricted loading gauge. As with No. 822, this locomotive used Holcroft's derivative of the Gresley conjugated valve gear to drive the inside cylinder. To accommodate this, the boiler had to be raised by 3 in (76 mm) above the inside gear, raising the centre of gravity on the locomotive.

The main visual difference between the K and K1 classes was at the front end: the K1 incorporated a vertical metal cover above the front buffer beam to protect the third cylinder and associated Holcroft valve gear assembly from the elements. It also featured a new cab design with redesigned single front spectacle plates, and a pair of substantially constructed steps were fitted behind both outside cylinders to provide access to the running plate. The lack of a middle cylinder on the K class locomotives had allowed the provision of a footplate that curved from the buffers to the water tanks. The K1 prototype emerged from Ashford works as No. A890, and underwent trials from 1 December 1925 before entering regular service. Only one locomotive of the K1 class was built; plans to build a further ten (Nos. A891-A900) alongside a batch of five N1 class 2-6-0s were cancelled after the Sevenoaks accident in August 1927. Following rebuilding as a 2-6-0 tender locomotive in 1928, No. A890 was reclassified U1 and was the forerunner of twenty more basically similar locomotives built in 1931.

=== K and K1 class construction history ===
Year	Batch	Quantity	SECR/SR numbers	Class
1917	SECR (Ashford Works)	1	790	K
1925	SR (Armstrong Whitworth)	9	A791–A799	K
1925	SR (Ashford Works)	1	A890	K1
1926	SR (Brighton Works)	10	A800–A809	K

=== Naming the locomotives ===
The K class prototype operated without a name until 1925, when the Southern Railway's publicity department decided to name all express passenger locomotives. The locomotives constructed from 1925 were named after rivers found within the Southern Railway's operating area, and the class became known collectively as the River class. The first-completed Southern Railway K class No. A791 was named River Adur whilst the former SECR prototype was given the name River Avon; names were also allocated to the cancelled 1926 batch of locomotives. The K1 class locomotive No. A890 was named River Frome. The names were displayed on a rectangular brass nameplate fitted to the water tank sides.

== Operational details ==
The K class was intended to haul the SECR's Kent expresses, and was trialled between Charing Cross, Tonbridge, Canterbury East and Folkestone East. A trial non-stop run between Cannon Street and Folkestone Harbour by No. 790 pulling a train of 300 long tons (305 t) had proved the water capacity of the side tanks to be insufficient for such runs. No. 790 was also tested on fast Cannon Street, Redhill and Tonbridge trains during the spring of 1922, although rough riding between the latter two stations meant slower speeds over that part of route on subsequent runs.

The Southern Railway's motive power re-organisation following the Grouping of 1923 expanded the class for operations over the Central section. The Westinghouse-fitted Armstrong Whitworth batch was used on the air-braked Eastbourne and Brighton expresses and regular passenger service trains to Portsmouth. The vacuum-braked Brighton batch was run-in on the Portsmouth route in preparation for operating the Redhill–Reading line, the class regularly hauling the daily Birkenhead–Dover through train. The K1 was mainly rostered to haul the early evening express from Cannon Street to Dover Marine.

=== Performance of the tank locomotives ===
The K class proved successful on well-maintained track. It was capable of high speeds on express passenger duties, although their use was limited by the lower storage capacity of tank locomotives, which meant the K and K1 classes were prone to water shortages on the long Kent Coast routes, and precluded them from working many of the former London and South Western Railway (LSWR) routes west of London. The need to save weight meant that compromises were made in some aspects of the design. The boiler size was constrained by the SECR's axle-loading restrictions, with the result that the design's full steaming potential was not realised. The failure to capitalise upon a larger boiler would also affect Maunsell's subsequent 2-6-0 classes, as they were given the same boiler despite their lower axle-loadings.

On the Southern Railway's Central and Eastern sections, crews complained that the locomotives rolled heavily and unpredictably on the cheaply laid track of the former SECR and LBSCR networks, leading to their nickname, "Rolling Rivers". The rolling was in part caused by the type of coil suspension and steadying springs used on the Bissel truck and bogie axles, which caused adverse springing on poor track. These were modified in later batches, with limited success. The rough-riding was also attributed to the frames, which were of insubstantial construction to save weight. The bracing proved incapable of counteracting the stresses applied to the frames when travelling at speed and caused excessive vibration on the footplate at higher outputs.

The K1 prototype was slightly faster and more powerful than the K class, and gave a smoother ride at low speeds. It was also found to have a wider route availability due to the smaller outside cylinders. However, the Holcroft valve gear proved to be difficult to maintain in everyday service. This locomotive was also noted for particularly poor riding characteristics at high speed, derailing twice in 1927. The first derailment occurred at Borough Green & Wrotham, near Maidstone on 31 March, when the flanges of the lead coupled wheel mounted the rails at 60 mph (97 km/h). The second derailment was at Bearsted on 20 August, when the lead driving wheel mounted and completely dropped off the rails at 40 mph (64 km/h), derailing the train and causing serious damage to the track. These derailments were attributed to the slightly higher centre of gravity of the boiler on the K1. Although the official reports of these accidents blamed the poor quality of the track, a group of directors sought to have both classes banned from use on passenger services, but were overruled by the Southern Railway's Chairman of the Board of Directors, Everard Baring on grounds of cost.

=== Accidents and incidents ===
- In March 1927, locomotive No. 890 River Frome was hauling a train which derailed at Wrotham, Kent.
- On 2 August 1927, Locomotive No. 800 River Cray was derailed at Maidstone, Kent.
- On 20 August 1927, locomotive No. 890 River Frome was hauling a passenger train which was derailed at Bearsted, Kent. The cause was attributed to track defects. The locomotive was repaired and re-entered service on 23 August. It was involved in a serious accident the next day.

==== Sevenoaks disaster ====
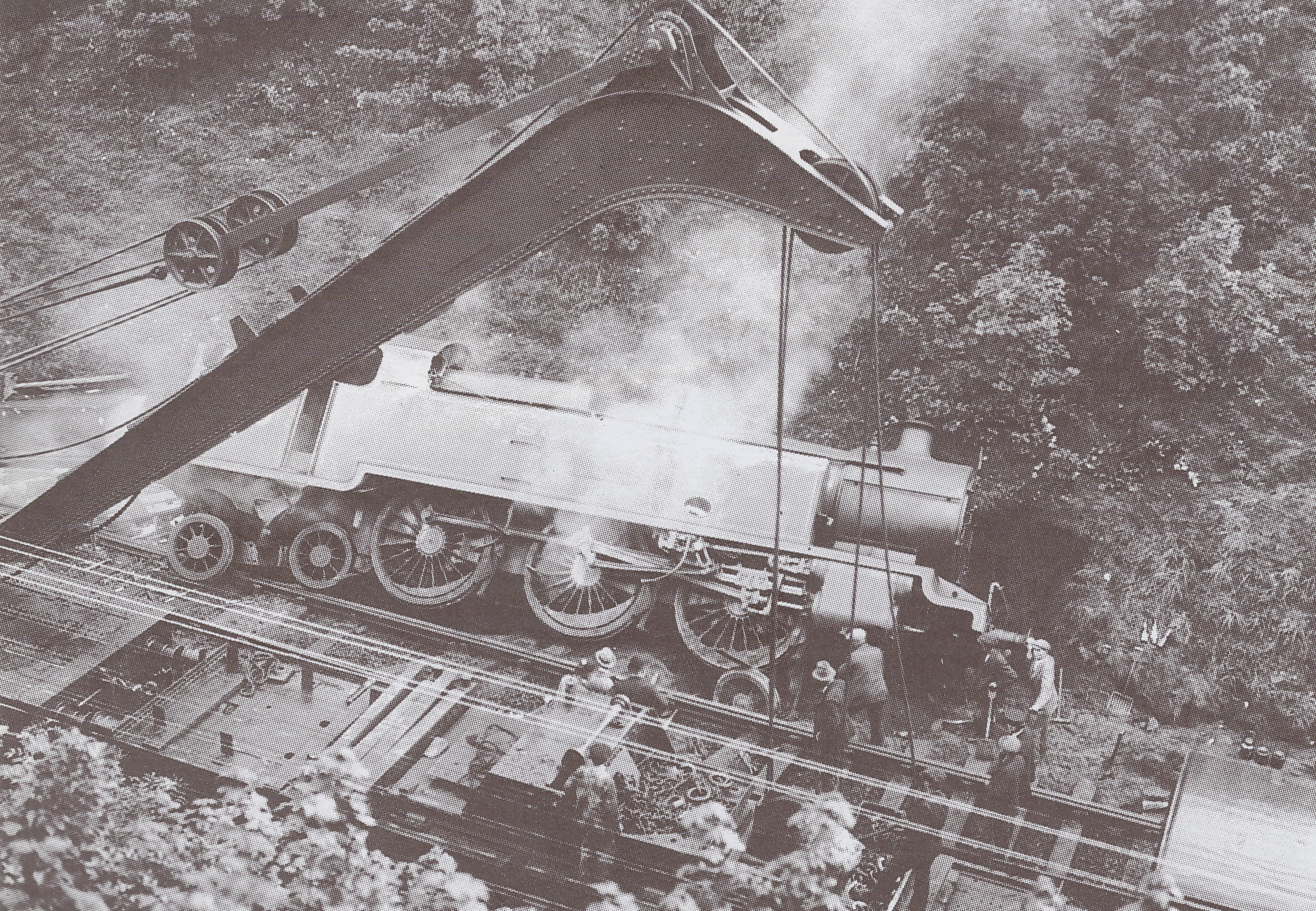
The derailed locomotive on its side following the Sevenoaks disaster.

The K and K1 classes suffered from stability problems when travelling at speed over points and curves. The locomotive would initially roll (briefly lean heavily) to one side, followed by several further rolls of gradually reducing amplitude, combined with a side-slipping movement that caused the driving wheels to mount the rails. Several minor derailments of members of the class were followed by the serious derailment of No. A800 River Cray at Sevenoaks, Kent, in August 1927, caused by a combination of a surge in the water tanks and the flanges of the locomotive's lead driving wheels mounting the rail at speed due to poor quality track-work. The locomotive was hauling a Cannon Street to Deal express with a Pullman carriage when the leading driving wheels derailed at 55 mph (89 km/h) over catch points in a cutting. Several carriages were flung against a road bridge, injuring 40 and killing 13 passengers.

In the days following the accident, two K and K1 class engines were trialled on the London and North Eastern Railway's (LNER) Great Northern mainline under the supervision of that company's CME, Nigel Gresley, to gain an unbiased review of their riding qualities. Locomotives No. A803 (K) and No. A890 (K1), and King Arthur class No. E782, were tested on the well-maintained LNER line between Huntingdon and St. Neots in October 1927, where few problems were found with locomotive stability. On runs between Kings Cross and Potters Bar with the LNER's dynamometer car, No. A890 was recorded at a top speed of 83 miles per hour (134 km/h) and A803 at 79 miles per hour (127 km/h), with no problems in riding. When these engines returned from the LNER, the Southern Railway's General Manager, Sir Herbert Walker ordered further trials to be led by Sir John Aspinall on the Western section main line near Woking. These were terminated by the Southern Railway's Operating Department, as the riding of the locomotives at speeds near 80 miles per hour (130 km/h) rendered the locomotives unsafe. The instability of No. A890 at speed was attributed to the helical springs on the Bissel truck and bogie.

The 1928 accident inquiry did not attach blame to the Southern Railway for track maintenance or locomotive performance issues, and noted that the prototype had run for eight years over the same stretch of line without complaint. However, it identified the Brighton batch and No. A890 as being more susceptible to rolling on sharp curves with weak rail joints, although the entire class operated without incident on the former LBSCR network. The management of the Southern Railway realised that to have any success in operating the K class tanks on other parts of the network, vast stretches of track would require upgrading. With the prospect of storing 20 locomotives whilst the necessary upgrading took place, the management recommended the class be fully withdrawn from service. To recoup the expense of constructing the engines, Maunsell was given permission to rebuild them to the new SR U class 2-6-0 tender engine design in 1928. This decision also reduced the adverse publicity generated by the accident. However, many of the components discarded during the rebuilding process would later be re-used on another 2-6-4 tank locomotive designed to haul heavy freight on short trips: the 3-cylinder W class of 1932.

== Rebuilding ==
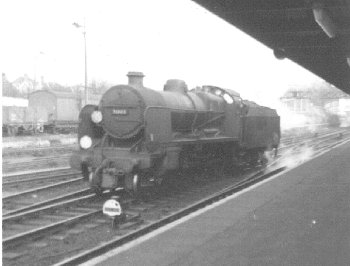
When rebuilt, the K class was incorporated into the U class. This is one of the rebuilds in British Railways service, No. 31803 at Bournemouth. As K class locomotive No. A803, it was named River Itchen.

The rebuilding of the class as tender locomotives was cheaper than relaying track, particularly as in most respects the class had performed well. Rebuilding took place at Ashford, Brighton and Eastleigh railway works between March and December 1928, where the water tanks, rear bogie and coal bunker were removed. The straight-sided 3,500-imperial-gallon (15,900 L) variant of Maunsell tender was attached, allowing a greater operational range for the locomotives. The rear bogies were later used on the SR W class 2-6-4 tank locomotives (the only subsequent use of this wheel arrangement by the Southern Railway, and their use was restricted to freight operations around London). The solitary K1 class locomotive was rebuilt in June 1928, and so became the three-cylinder prototype of the SR U1 class. The Holcroft valve gear was later replaced with a third set of Walschaerts valve gear in February 1932, thus reducing maintenance. None of the rebuilds retained their names.

=== Performance of the rebuilt locomotives and withdrawal ===
As members of the U and U1 classes, rebuilds were used mainly on mixed-traffic as well as secondary passenger duties on lines between the main routes. They were used all over the Southern Railway network, but were little-used over the steep track gradients west of Exeter. The smaller-wheeled N class was preferred amongst crews for the same duties, as high-speed running was rare away from the main lines in the West Country. Heavier passenger work was allocated to Bulleid's Unrebuilt Light Pacifics, which were within weight restrictions in this area. The 21 rebuilt locomotives entered British Railways service in 1948. From 1955 a few were given replacement frames at overhaul: these had a shallower curve between the front buffer beam and the smokebox.

Withdrawals took place between 1962 and 1966, by which time many of the rebuilds were based at Guildford shed. Work was taken over by Oliver Bulleid's Light Pacifics, and the electrification of much of the former Southern Railway network was imminent, making all the 2-6-0s surplus to requirements from 1963. The final rebuild was withdrawn from service in June 1966.

== Livery and numbering ==
=== SECR and Southern Railway ===
The K class prototype was painted in an unlined dark grey livery with white lettering and numbering. This Maunsell grey livery was introduced by the SECR as a wartime economy measure. On Grouping in 1923, the SR replaced the liveries of the constituent companies with a standard sage green livery (the colour being that previously used by Urie on the LSWR) with black and white lining, primrose yellow numbering and "Southern" on the tender. From 1925, the K and K1 classes were repainted in a darker olive green livery, introduced by Maunsell, with plain white lining and primrose yellow markings. When rebuilt into the U and U1 classes, the locomotives were repainted in the olive green livery with "Southern" added to the tender tank. This was carried into the Second World War when labour shortages meant that many U class locomotives were painted in plain black, with the result that by 1945 all the class were running in black.

The class prototype was initially numbered 790, with the rest following consecutively with a prefix "A" to denote a locomotive designed for the former SECR. The system of prefixes had been adopted by the SR to distinguish between locomotives with identical numbers acquired from different companies, and the K1 class became No. A890 when built in 1925. This system was replaced from 1928 by a renumbering of all locomotives into one sequence, in which the K class rebuilds became Nos. 1790–1809, and the K1 class rebuild became No. 1890.

=== Rebuilds in British Railways service ===
The K and K1 classes were absorbed by British Railways as part of the U and U1 classes in 1948, which were given the BR power classification 4MT (mixed-traffic) in 1950. This was later revised to 4P3F in the light of operational experience on freight trains. The locomotives at first retained their Southern Railway livery, with "British Railways" added to the tender when repaints were due. From 1949 to 1955, the U and U1 class locomotives were gradually repainted in the British Railways mixed-traffic lined black livery with red, cream and grey lining and the British Railways crest on the tender. Numbers were changed to the British Railways standard numbering system: the series 31790–31809 was allocated to the K class rebuilds, and 31890 to the K1 class.

== Operational assessment and preservation ==
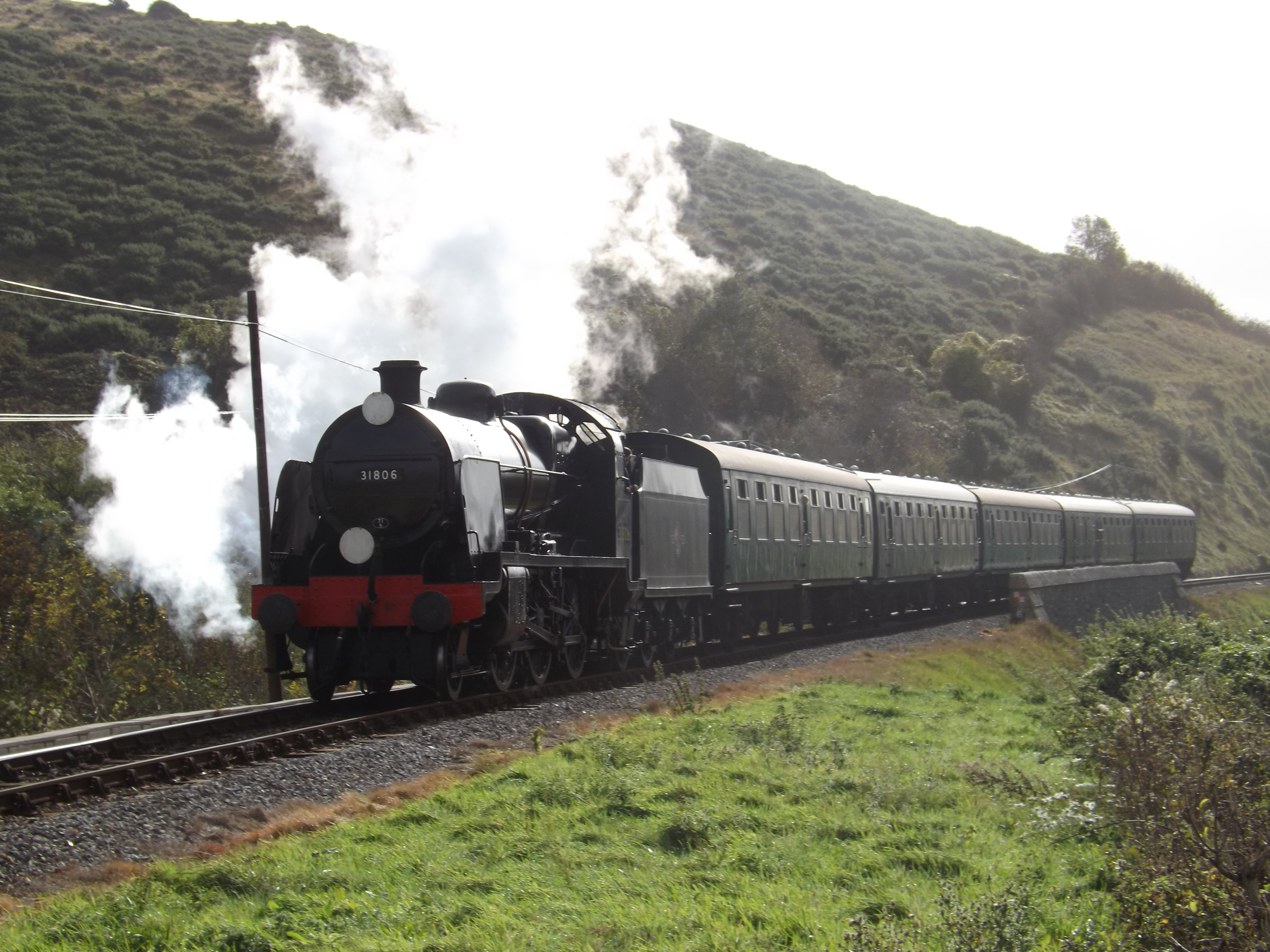
31806 near Corfe Castle on the Swanage Railway.

Sir Nigel Gresley's independent report on the K and K1 classes during the mainline stability trials stated that they were well designed, mechanically reliable and capable of hauling expresses at high speeds on well-maintained track, which meant that they could have been useful additions to the Southern Railway's suburban commuter fleet. However, they were undoubtedly prone to rough riding and instability, and not only on the poorest quality tracks. The restricted water capacity also limited their use outside the Southern Railway's Central section. The impending electrification of the Brighton Main Line, scheduled for 1932 also meant that fewer duties suitable for heavy passenger tank locomotives would be available in the 1930s. The lack of a suitable role for both classes was considered when the decision was made to rebuild them as U/U1 tender engines following the Sevenoaks disaster. In rebuilt form they continued to operate until the 1960s, and were capable of attaining speeds in excess of 70 mph (110 km/h) with a greater degree of stability.

One K class rebuild has survived: No. A806 River Torridge – converted to U class No. 1806 – was rescued from Woodham Brothers scrap yard in Barry, Vale of Glamorgan, South Wales in October 1976 for use on the Watercress Line. It was restored to ex-British Railways condition as No. 31806. In August 2014, the locomotive entered service with the Swanage Railway.

== See also ==
- List of SECR K and SR K1 class locomotives
