= SR U1 class =

British steam locomotive class

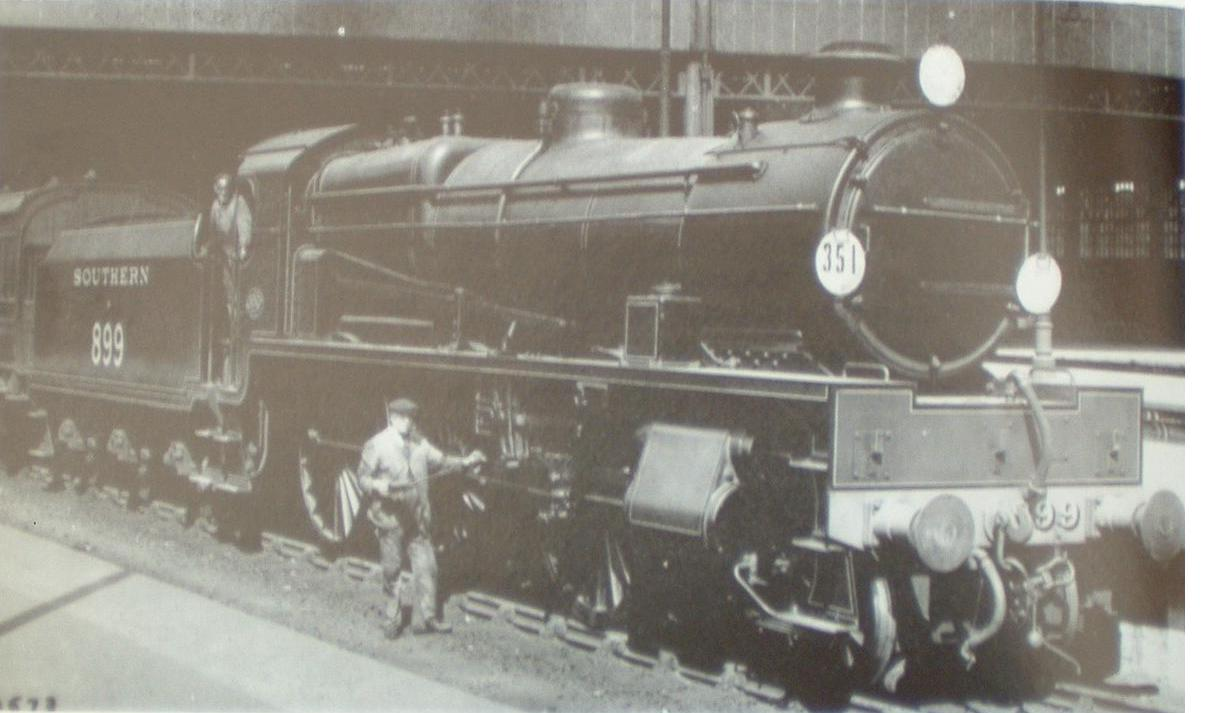
- Maunsell U1 class 2-6-0 Number A899 (Eastleigh 1931) at Waterloo. Note the slab-front – incorporated above the front buffer beam to house the inside cylinder – and the absence of smoke deflectors
Type and origin
- Power type: Steam
- Designer: Richard Maunsell
- Builder: SR Ashford/Eastleigh Works
- Build date: 1928–1931
- Total produced: 20 (+1 rebuilt from K1 class)
Specifications
- Configuration
  - Whyte: 2-6-0
  - UIC: 1′C h3
- Gauge: 4 ft 8 1/2 in (1,435 mm) standard gauge
- Leading dia.: 3 ft 1 in (0.940 m)
- Driver dia.: 6 ft 0 in (1.829 m)
- Length: 57 ft 10 in (17.63 m)
- Total weight: 107 long tons 14 cwt (241,200 lb or 109.4 t); 109.4 t; 120.6 short tons
- Fuel type: Coal
- Fuel capacity: 5 long tons 0 cwt (11,200 lb or 5.1 t); 5.1 t; 5.6 short tons
- Water cap.: 4,000 imp gal (18,000 L; 4,800 US gal)
- Boiler pressure: 200 lbf/in^{2} (1.38 MPa)
- Cylinders: Three
- Cylinder size: 16 in × 28 in (406 mm × 711 mm)
- Valve gear: Walschaerts
Performance figures
- Tractive effort: 25,387 lbf (112.93 kN)
Career
- Operators: Southern Railway →; British Railways
- Class: SR: U1
- Power class: SR: B; BR 1949–53: 4MT; BR 1953 on: 4P3F
- Nicknames: "Montys"
- Locale: Southern Region
- Withdrawn: 1962–1963
- Disposition: All scrapped

The SR U1 class were three-cylinder 2-6-0 ('mogul') steam locomotives designed by Richard Maunsell for passenger duties on the Southern Railway. The fifth member of the Maunsell "family" of standardised moguls and 2-6-4 locomotives, the U1 was the final development of the Maunsell mogul, and marked a continuation of the basic principles established by CME George Jackson Churchward for the GWR. Developed from Maunsell's previous SR U class design, the U1 class shared characteristics with Churchward's GWR 4300 Class.

The U1 prototype was a rebuild of the unique 3-cylinder SR K1 ("River") class 2-6-4 tank locomotive, becoming operational in June 1928. The design was part of a drive to create a standard fleet of locomotives using parts interchangeable with other Maunsell-designed classes. The three smaller cylinders increased their route availability over the 2-cylinder U class. The K1 rebuild featured a variant of the Gresley conjugated valve gear, previously trialled on the SR N1 class prototype, designed by one of Maunsell's assistants, ex-GWR engineer Harold Holcroft.

The class was to supersede the production of N1 class locomotives because of its good performance, which amounted to an order for 20 more U1 locomotives in 1931. Production was halted at 21 locomotives, the class gained a good reputation amongst crews, and all were transferred to British Railways (BR) ownership following nationalisation in 1948. They continued to give valuable service until the Kentish main line electrification scheme was completed in the early 1960s. The entire U1 class was withdrawn from service by 1963, and none were preserved.

== Background ==
Work on the new design of locomotive was undertaken in 1928 following the construction of the first of Maunsell's U class locomotives. Maunsell wished to create a more powerful version with greater route availability than its predecessors. The Southern Railway had inherited routes with restricted loading gauge where the large, overhanging cylinders of a 2-cylinder locomotive could foul the walls of bridges and tunnels. The new locomotive was intended to complement the U class by providing another locomotive capable of undertaking passenger duties on the Eastern section of the Southern Railway network between London and Ramsgate. The new locomotive, like the U and N classes before it, was intended to replace obsolete 0-6-0 classes in an attempt to standardise and ease maintenance by sharing parts with other Maunsell designs. Several K class 2-cylinder 2-6-4 locomotives had been successfully rebuilt as U class moguls, leaving the solitary 3-cylinder K1 class 2-6-4 number A890 River Frome for similar treatment.

Maunsell enlisted the help of the former GWR engineer Harold Holcroft, who had been recruited by the SECR as one of Maunsell's assistants. At Holcroft's suggestion, the rebuilt locomotive was to feature a 2-6-0 wheel arrangement, enabling it to operate over the lightly laid track-work on the Eastern section of the Southern Railway, whilst allowing an increased size of boiler to those featured on the 0-6-0s. As the rebuild used similar parts to the N and K classes to aid mass production, the new locomotive also had many features previously found on the successful GWR 4300 class, following and improving upon Churchward's design principles for this locomotive type. The redesigned locomotive was re-designated U1, and retained Holcroft's variant of the Gresley conjugated valve gear used on the K1 2-6-4. To facilitate the rebuild, Maunsell used his past experience with the N1 class 3-cylinder locomotives as a template for the new design. The style of the new locomotive also demonstrated the Midland Railway influences of Maunsell's other assistant, the ex-Midland Railway engineer James Clayton.

== Construction details ==
=== Holcroft valve gear ===
The valve gear assembly originally designed by Holcroft for use on the N1 class regulated the timing of the valve events that admitted steam into the cylinder, increasing efficiency whilst reducing mechanical wear and the effects of hammerblow on the track. Holcroft incorporated a new method of driving the middle cylinder from the right-hand set of the two outside Walschaerts valve gear without the need to use a separate set of valve gear between the frames, saving overall weight. This was achieved by using the combination lever assembly that controlled the fore and aft movement of the valve spindle, which admitted "live" steam into the cylinder and ejected "spent" steam through the ports.

Holcroft's process of driving the middle cylinder directly from the combination lever contrasted to the approach taken by Sir Nigel Gresley, who used an extension of the valve spindles on the outside valve gear to operate the middle cylinders of his locomotives. This variant therefore held an advantage over Gresley's design, as the Holcroft valve gear would be immune to variations in valve events brought about by heat expansion of the valve spindles and flexing of the conjugation levers when in heavy use.

=== Locomotive A890 ===
Work started on the conversion of the solitary 3-cylinder K1 class No. A890 to a 2-6-0 tender locomotive design at Ashford works in early 1928. The retention of the cylinder arrangement and valve gear lowered conversion costs, and meant that the locomotive could readily meet the route availability specification. Because of Holcroft's position as one of Maunsell's assistants, the new locomotive displayed many Swindon influences, making them similar to Churchward's 4300 class. The Swindon ideas had also been used on the N, K, N1, U and K1 class designs, which included the Belpaire firebox and conical boilers, constructed at the North British Locomotive Works in Glasgow.

The similarity with GWR locomotive practice ended there, as a Midland Railway influence could be found in the placement of the locomotive fittings, with water top-feed into the boiler located inside a dome, although a modification was made to the cab area, which was a variation of those featured on the N class and the 0-6-0s of Henry Fowler. The aesthetic aspects of the locomotive were contributed by another of Maunsell's assistants, James Clayton, who had moved to the SECR from the Midland Railway. The new locomotives also varied with the increased amount of superheating surface area, and the outside valves were controlled by Walschaerts valve gear.

The rebuilding process involved the removal of the side water tanks, the rear coal bunker and the trailing axles. In featuring similar components to the U class, the U1 was similar in profile, although a slab-front was incorporated above the front buffer beam to house the third cylinder and associated valve gear assembly between the frames. Nevertheless, the U1 retained the 6 ft (1.83 m) driving wheels and general cab layout of the U class, and the Maunsell 3,500-imperial-gallon (15,911 L; 4,203.3 US gal) tender previously used on the N class locomotives, with No. A890 entering revenue-earning service in June 1928.

=== Main batch, differences with No. A890 and modifications ===
No. A890 was the only U1 class member in operation as trials were undertaken to ascertain whether the design should be perpetuated instead of the N1 class for use on the more restricted routes of the Southern Railway. The success of the prototype U1 over the N1 design led to a construction order for a further 20 locomotives to be built at Eastleigh in 1931. Despite the possible weight savings with the Holcroft valve gear, the complexity of maintaining the linkage with the inside cylinder meant that the new class members were fitted with three separate sets of Walschaerts valve gear for all cylinders. As had happened with the N1 class prototype No. A822, No. A890 was modified to this revised specification in 1930 to reduce maintenance costs. Prior to the modification of No. A890, the new locomotives were visibly different by the absence of the outside-to-inside valve linkage assembly and were given larger tenders with a water capacity of 4,000-imperial-gallon (18,184 L; 4,803.8 US gal), although the slab-front was retained.

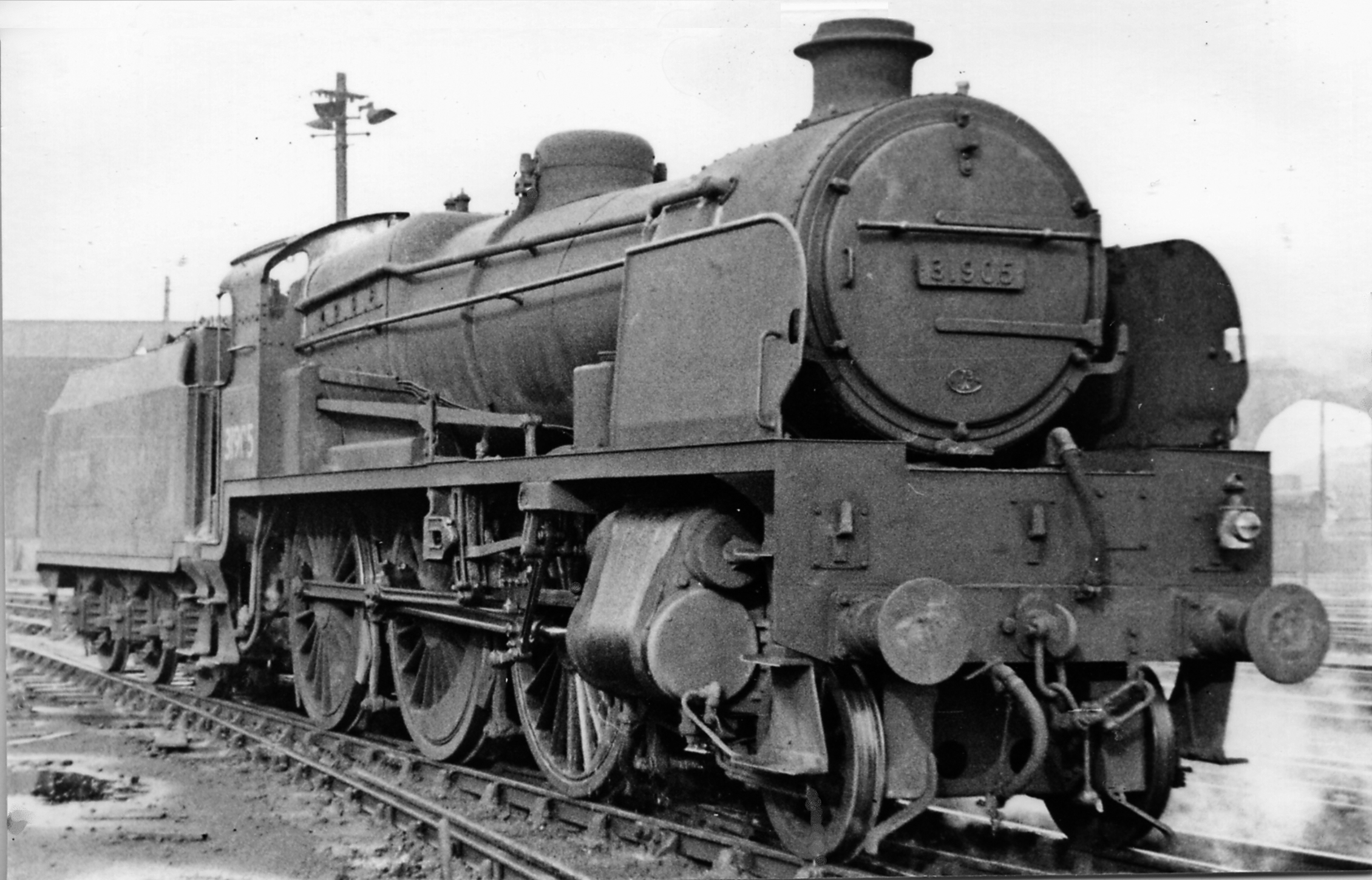
No. 31905 (with Smoke deflectors) at Stewarts Lane Locomotive Depot 7 April 1951.

Further changes were made to the design, as No. A890 featured right-hand drive, impeding forward vision for viewing signals from the footplate. The main batch was produced with left-hand drive to resolve this problem. The main batch could also be distinguished by their higher running plates along the sides of the boiler, compared to the lower version on the rebuild that required larger wheel splashers to cover the tops of the driving wheels. The main batch had also dispensed with the N class/Midland Railway-style double spectacle plates (the small windows on the front face of the cab) that was retained on the prototype, replacing them with one each side of the boiler. The production locomotives also had a flatter top to the dome covers than that seen on the rebuild. The cabside cutaways for driver visibility were also cut into the roof of A890, an arrangement reminiscent of the 2-cylinder U class rebuilds of K class locomotives.

The entire U1 class had smokebox snifting valves, a feature previously used on the other Maunsell moguls. The main batch saw the front steps relocated ahead of the cylinders, as opposed to behind on the A890 rebuild, which was another relic of its previous guise as a 2-6-4 tank locomotive. Smoke deflectors were fitted to the whole class from 1933, as with most of the locomotives designed by Maunsell. The smokebox snifting valves were removed by Oliver Bulleid by the end of the Second World War, although the U1 class chimney was used to improve draughting on the other Maunsell moguls.

== Operational details and preservation ==
The U1 class was a reliable and economical design like its U class predecessor, being similarly capable of speeds in excess of 70 mph (110 km/h), whilst displaying excellent traction and acceleration characteristics. The trials made by the Southern Railway on the prototype decided the eventual route availability of the class so that they became a regular fixture on the restricted Tonbridge to Hastings route alongside their N1 class cousins. Their route availability also meant that they were used on Central section trains to Portsmouth and Southampton until replaced by V class locomotives. The U1 class worked troop trains along this route during the Second World War, proving their worth as rugged locomotives. However, a trial on the Somerset and Dorset proved that the design was not good on steep gradients, and was thus confined to the Central and Eastern sections of the Southern Railway network. Crews praised their ability to achieve what they were designed to do, being thoroughly at home with the secondary duties that suited such a locomotive. The class was to be the final member of Maunsell's series of moguls, but the off-cuts from the rebuilding of the K class and a similar boiler were used on yet another of the "family" of standardized locomotives, the 3-cylinder W class 2-6-4 heavy freight tank engine.

All locomotives were inherited by British Railways in 1948, and from 1955, several members of the class received new chimneys of the British Railways Standard Class 4 variety and replacement cylinders, which had become worn through intensive use. No major redesign of the front-end of the U1 class was required, with all the steam passages fully streamlined as a result of experience with the previous five Maunsell designs. The U1 Class members working on the Hastings route were subjected to excess flange wear because of the tight curves, a problem also experienced when used on the network west of Exeter, when the aging T9 class 4-4-0 locomotives designed by Dugald Drummond were finally withdrawn from service in the early 1960s. The locomotive crews of the area took a dislike to the U1 in preference to the smaller-wheeled N class, which performed better on the steeper gradients found in this part of the railway network. With the electrification of the Kentish main lines of the Eastern section, the amount of work that required the U1 class' route availability advantage was reduced, and the class was congregated at Stewarts Lane shed in London. The majority of the class was withdrawn from service in 1962, with the final three (including the prototype) gone by June 1963, outlasting their N1 class siblings by one year. Having been replaced by Bulleid's Light Pacifics, no members of the U1 class were preserved.

== Livery and numbering ==
=== Southern ===
The entire class was painted in Maunsell's lined Southern Railway Olive Green with yellow markings and "Southern" on the tender. During the Second World War, the class was painted wartime black livery with Bulleid's "Sunshine Yellow" lettering. The U1s were initially numbered in the Southern Railway's post-grouping series from A890–A900 for the first eleven constructed. The letter "A" reflected the post-grouping practice of the Southern Railway to denote the engine's place of origin within the pre-grouping (SECR in this case) number. This helped to prevent confusion with locomotives of similar numbers that the Southern Railway acquired from other pre-grouping companies. The "A" in this case denotes Ashford works. This was changed to the series 1890–1910 during the 1930s, when the final members of the class were constructed.

=== British Railways ===
The class was absorbed by British Railways in 1948, and in January 1949 were given the British Railways power classification 4MT. In October 1953 this was revised to 4P3F. Livery was initially similar to the Southern Railway, though with "British Railways" on the tender, and an 'S' prefix to the Southern number. This was succeeded by the British Railways mixed-traffic lined black livery with red, cream and grey lining and the British Railways crest on the tender. The British Railways standard numbering system was used to replace the Southern Railway system, and the class was allocated the series 31890–31910.
