= SR W class =

Class of 15 three-cylinder locomotives

SR Class W
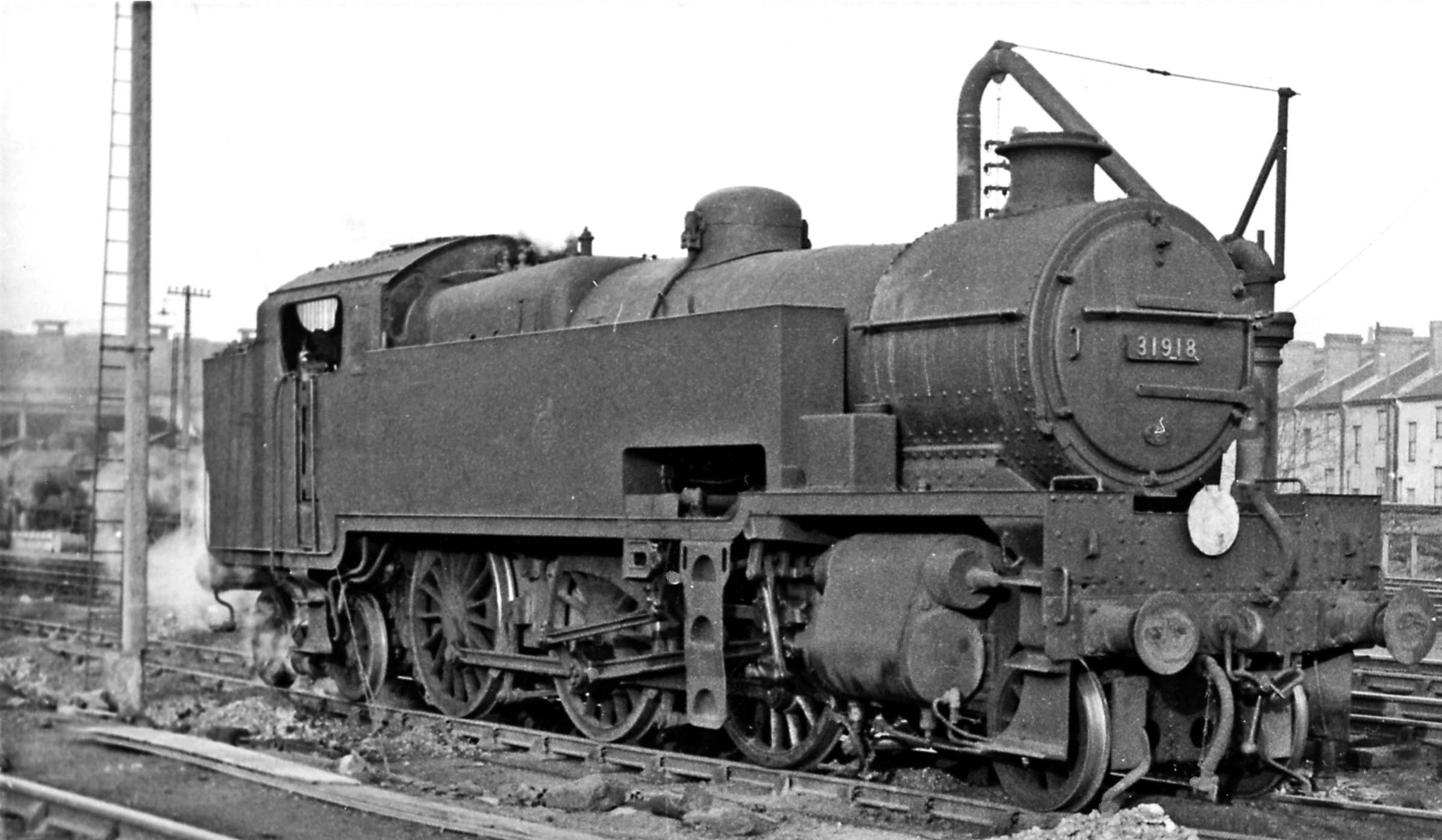
- No. 31918 (first batch built June 1935) at Norwood Junction Locomotive Depot 12 March 1960
Type and origin
- Power type: Steam
- Designer: Richard Maunsell
- Builder: SR Eastleigh Works; SR Ashford Works
- Build date: 1930-1936
- Total produced: 15
Specifications
- Configuration
  - Whyte: 2-6-4T
  - UIC: 1′C2′ h3t
- Gauge: 4 ft 8 1/2 in (1,435 mm) standard gauge
- Leading dia.: 3 ft 1 in (0.940 m)
- Driver dia.: 5 ft 6 in (1.676 m)
- Trailing dia.: 3 ft 1 in (0.940 m)
- Length: 44 ft 0.25 in (13.42 m)
- Loco weight: 90 long tons 14 cwt (203,200 lb or 92.2 t); 92.2 t; 101.6 short tons
- Fuel type: Coal
- Fuel capacity: 3 long tons 10 cwt (7,800 lb or 3.6 t); 3.6 t; 3.9 short tons
- Water cap.: 2,000 imp gal (9,100 L; 2,400 US gal)
- Boiler pressure: 200 psi (1.38 MPa)
- Cylinders: 3
- Cylinder size: 16 1/2 in × 28 in (419 mm × 711 mm)
Performance figures
- Tractive effort: 29,452 lbf (131.01 kN)
Career
- Operators: Southern Railway; British Railways
- Class: SR: W
- Power class: BR: 5F, later 6F
- Numbers: SR: 1911–1925; BR: 31911–31925
- Locale: Southern Region
- Withdrawn: 1963–1964
- Disposition: All scrapped

The SR Class W were 3-cylinder 2-6-4T tank engines designed in 1929 by Richard Maunsell for use on the Southern Railway. They were introduced in 1932 and constructed at Eastleigh and Ashford. The class was intended for short distance, inter-company/regional freight traffic transfer in London, and were standardised with parts from the N, N1, U and U1 classes.

== Background ==
From the 1920s London was surrounded by a number of large freight Marshalling yards, where long-distance freight trains were brought and re-organised into new trains for onward transmission to their destinations. Three of these yards, at Feltham, Norwood and Hither Green, were operated by the Southern Railway. The requirement for a fast freight transfer locomotive between these yards, and across London to other railway yards, provided a challenge for Richard Maunsell. The electrified suburban lines were busy with commuter traffic which took priority over freight workings, and the London network abounded with junctions and signal stops.

The design brief called for a powerful locomotive with good acceleration and adhesion: one that was able to climb the steep gradients over the flying junctions that were to be found all over the Southern Railway's London network. The ability to operate over tight curves and be able to pull away from a standstill on the aforementioned gradients were also key considerations that needed to be incorporated into the design. A tank locomotive design was also preferable since the journeys were relatively short, and the work would involve frequent changes in direction.

== Design ==
The SR Z class was considered at first, but due to the specialist characteristics of the design as a yard engine for marshalling freight, they were not deemed fit for the purpose of hauling loads under the tight timings of London's railway system. The solution was a smaller wheeled version of the ill-fated K1 River class tank engines, with three cylinders to allow for better acceleration and three sets of Walschaerts valve gear. (Note: The three cylinder K1s had used Holcroft's conjugated valvegear to drive three cylinders from just two sets of Walschaerts gear.) The resultant W class was designed in 1929.

As a result of the rebuilding of the K1 class following the Sevenoaks railway accident, surplus bogies and leading wheels were available for the new design. A Cartazzi axle was used for the leading pair of wheels rather than a swivelling pony truck. The 2-6-4 wheel arrangement was settled upon as being ideal for intensive suburban routes, and the use of parts from the K Class and the same boiler as used on the N, N1 and U1 classes enabled the standardisation of Southern locomotives to continue. The locomotives were provided with heavy braking equipment in order to handle the trains of freight wagons with or without continuous brakes that were in use at the time. With this in mind the class was (unusually) provided with extra braking on the bogie wheels.

== Construction history ==
An initial order was placed with Eastleigh railway works for ten locomotives, with the frames to be constructed at Ashford railway works and the boilers at Brighton railway works. However, by the time that Ashford had delivered the first five sets of frames in early 1930 a severe trade recession meant that they were no longer needed. The frames were stored and the boilers used as spares for the N and U class locomotives. By mid 1931 trade had recovered to allow construction of the initial five to be completed. These were delivered during January and February 1932. The components for the remaining five locomotives still on order were gathered at Eastleigh during 1932, but once again their construction was delayed pending a more sustained economic recovery, and the boilers were used elsewhere. A second batch consisting of these five locomotives together with a further five ordered in March 1930 were eventually delivered between April 1935 and April 1936. Eastleigh works was then committed to the construction of the Schools class and so the order was transferred to Ashford.

=== Variations ===
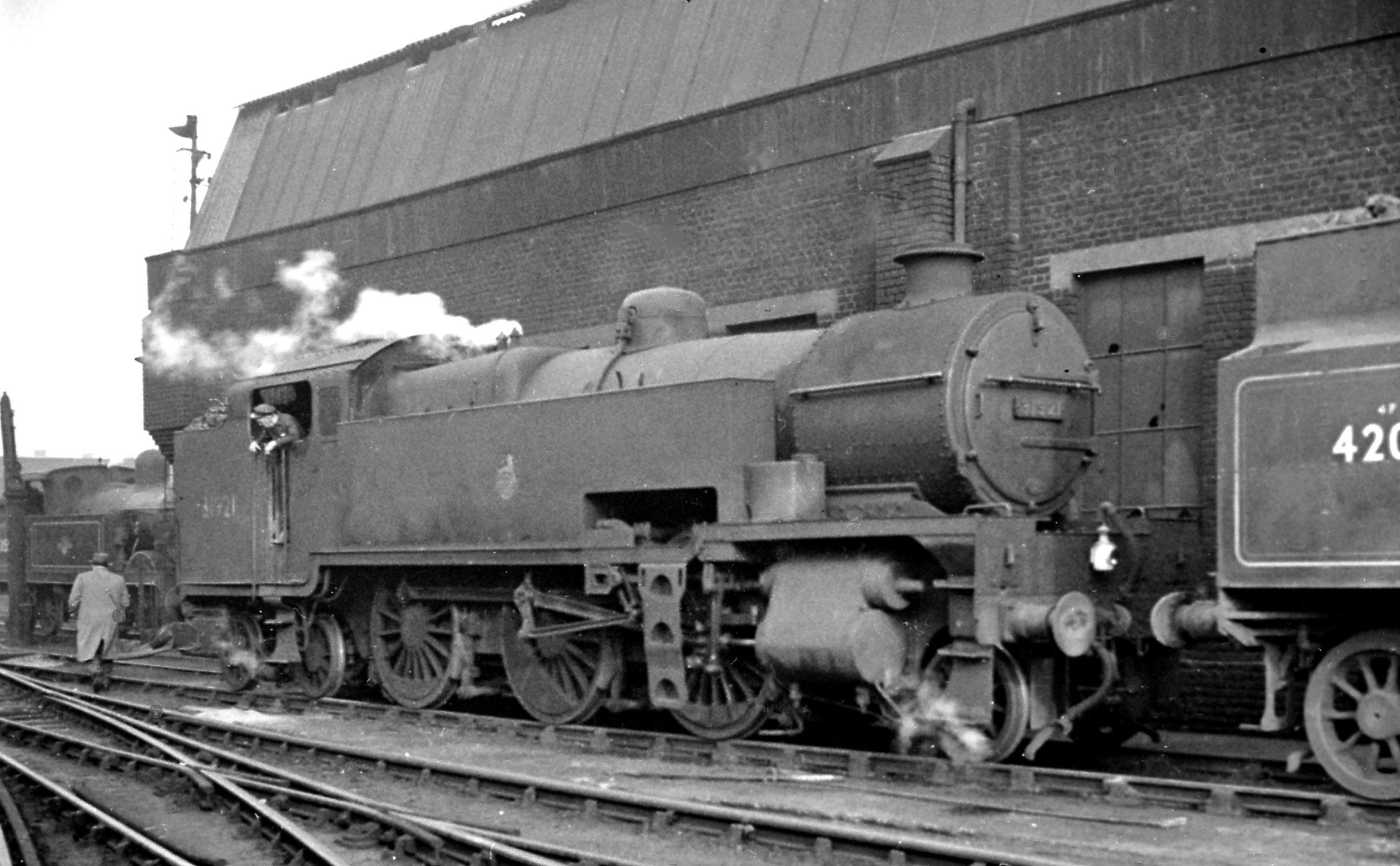
W class 2-6-4T Nº 31921 (2nd batch) on Stewarts Lane Locomotive Depot 15 February 1958.

The two batches differed from each other because the Eastleigh batch had gravity sanding capability and steam regulators on the right hand side, whilst the Ashford batch had steam sanding and regulators on the left, as was common on most other classes of Southern locomotives.

=== Modifications ===
The first batch was modified between 1959 and 1960 to incorporate steam sanding, as this was already present on the Ashford batch. The right hand driving, however, remained.

== Livery and numbering ==
=== Southern ===
The first batch was turned out in black livery with green lining, and were numbered 1911–1915 with 'Southern' in yellow on the water tanks. The Ashford batch was outshopped in unlined black livery, and the initial batch were also converted to this new livery. These locomotives were numbered 1916–1925.

=== Post-1948 (nationalisation) ===
The locomotives retained their freight black liveries, and the BR crest was placed on the water tank sides. Numbering was per the BR standard numbering system, in the range 31911–31925.

== Operational details ==
The class was mainly used around London working from Hither Green, Norwood and Feltham yards. They were also used on inter-company/regional transfer freight duties over the West London Line to Old Oak Common, Willesden, Cricklewood and Ferme Park marshalling yards.

The class was generally well liked by their crews apart from the fact that the driver was on the right hand side of the Eastleigh batch, which made accurate stopping difficult when signalling was predominantly on the left on the Southern network. This would have meant that the fireman was frequently utilised as lookout on the left hand side.

In 1948 there was a chronic shortage of large passenger tank locomotives on the un-electrified lines of the former London Brighton and South Coast Railway. As a result, trials of the class were made with passenger stock between Victoria railway station and Tunbridge Wells West railway station via the Oxted Line. However, like the K and K1 classes the W class were found to be unstable at speed and were banned from use on passenger trains.

== Withdrawal ==
The class began to be withdrawn from service in 1963, with the last removed from the books in 1964. No examples of this class of locomotive survived into preservation.

Table of withdrawals
Year	Quantity in service at start of year	Quantity withdrawn	Locomotive numbers
1963	15	10	31911/15–16/18–23/25.
1964	5	5	31912–14/17/24.
