= SECR N1 class =

Class of 6 three-cylinder 2-6-0 locomotives

SECR/SR N1 class
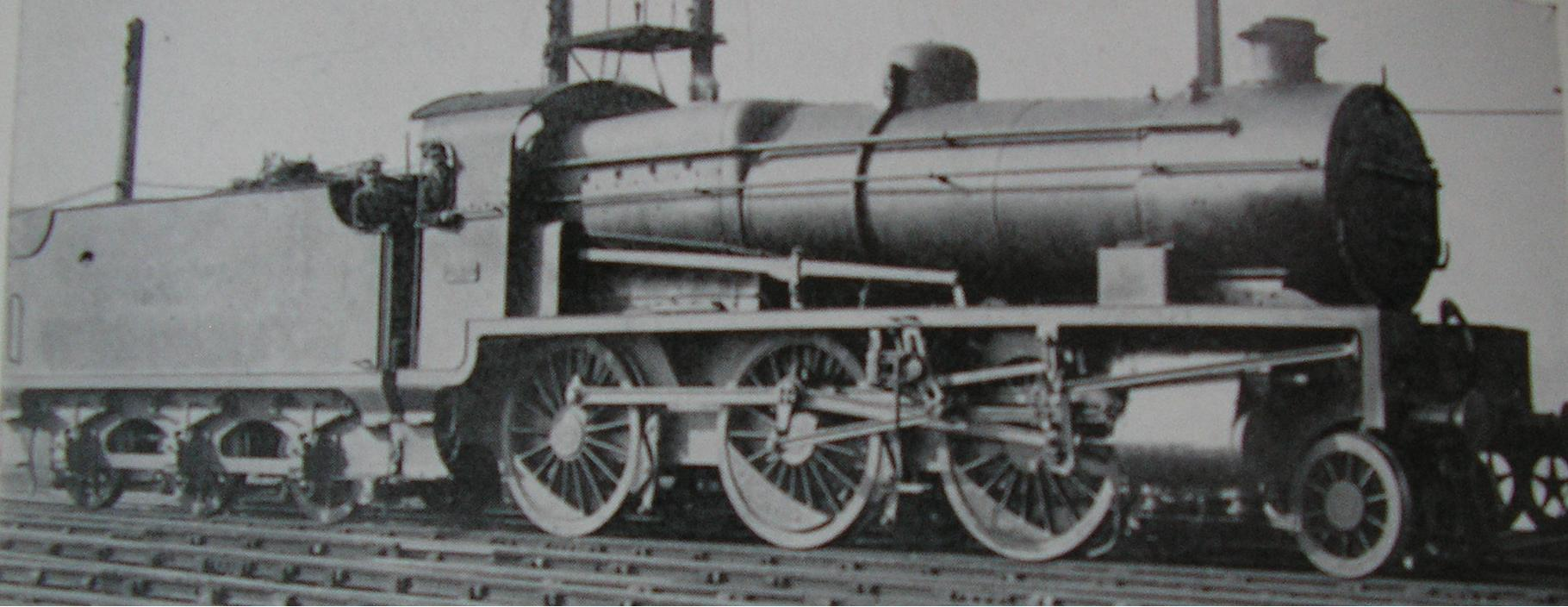
- The N1 class prototype, No. 822 seen here at the SECR's Ashford works in 1922. Smoke deflectors were added during the early 1930s. Note the linkage for Holcroft's inside valve gear, connecting the right-hand combination lever assembly and the inside cylinder
Type and origin
- Power type: Steam
- Designer: Richard Maunsell
- Builder: SECR/SR Ashford Works
- Build date: 1922 (1), 1934 (5)
- Total produced: 6
Specifications
- Configuration
  - Whyte: 2-6-0 ('mogul')
  - UIC: 1′C h3
- Gauge: 4 ft 8 1/2 in (1,435 mm) standard gauge
- Leading dia.: 3 ft 1 in (0.940 m)
- Driver dia.: 5 ft 6 in (1.676 m)
- Length: 57 ft 10 in (17.63 m)
- Total weight: 106 long tons 13 cwt (238,900 lb or 108.4 t) (119.5 short tons)
- Fuel type: Coal
- Fuel capacity: 5 long tons (5.1 t; 5.6 short tons)
- Water cap.: A822: 3,500 imperial gallons (15,900 L; 4,200 US gal); A876–A880: 4,000 imperial gallons (18,200 L; 4,800 US gal)
- Boiler pressure: 200 lbf/in^{2} (13.79 bar; 1.38 MPa)
- Cylinders: Three
- Cylinder size: 16 in × 26 in (406 mm × 660 mm)
Performance figures
- Tractive effort: 27,695 lbf (123.19 kN)
Career
- Operators: South Eastern and Chatham Railway; → Southern Railway; → British Railways
- Class: SECR / SR: N1
- Power class: BR: 4P5F
- Locale: Southern Region
- Withdrawn: 1962
- Disposition: All scrapped

The SECR N1 class was a type of 3-cylinder 2-6-0 ('mogul') steam locomotive designed by Richard Maunsell for mixed traffic duties, initially on the South Eastern and Chatham Railway (SECR), and later operated for the Southern Railway (SR). The N1 was a development of the basic principles established by the Great Western Railway's (GWR) Chief Mechanical Engineer (CME) George Jackson Churchward and by Maunsell's previous N class design.

The N1 prototype was the result of modifications made to N class No. 822 during construction in 1922. The locomotive became operational in 1923 and used parts interchangeable with other Maunsell locomotive classes. The prototype N1 was the only member of the class constructed before the SECR became part of the Southern Railway at the Grouping in 1923, and featured Holcroft conjugated valve gear, Holcroft's experience in this field later aided in the development of the Gresley conjugated valve gear which differed only in deriving the drive for gear from the valve spindle instead of the combination lever. The class set the precedent for the Southern Railway's subsequent 3-cylinder designs.

The N1s compared favourably with the N class, although the type showed little improvement in performance. More of the class were built when it became clear that the type's smaller cylinders provided greater route availability. A total of six engines were built. The N1 class was primarily used on the Eastern section of the Southern Railway network, and used by the Southern Region of British Railways (BR) from 1948. The N1s gave valuable service until they were withdrawn in 1962. None were preserved.

== Background ==
Richard Maunsell's N class mixed-traffic 2-6-0 prototype for the South Eastern and Chatham Railway (SECR) was completed in 1917. It showed a marked improvement in performance over his predecessor Harry Wainwright's 0-6-0 and 4-4-0 designs when tested on freight and local passenger trains. The success of the prototype encouraged the SECR management to order a batch of 15 in 1919 after government restrictions regulating locomotive production during the First World War were relaxed. Ashford locomotive works was already committed to undertaking deferred repair work however, which temporarily slowed construction of new locomotives. This resulted in the gradual completion of the 1919 N class order as works capacity permitted between 1920 and 1923.

Operational experience with the N class prototype demonstrated that it was capable of coping with peacetime passenger and freight traffic on the mainline between London and Ramsgate, but Maunsell anticipated an increase in traffic that would require a more powerful locomotive capable of hauling longer trains. The use of larger engines was prevented by low permitted axle loadings on parts of the SECR network, caused by economies in track construction by using flint beach pebbles as track ballast; this material failed to hold the track in place when under strain and could not support heavy locomotives. In the meantime Maunsell settled upon producing a 3-cylinder version of the N class 2-6-0, which provided the opportunity to test a variant of the Gresley conjugated valve gear developed by his assistant, Harold Holcroft.

== Design and construction ==
Maunsell and Holcroft completed plans for a new 3-cylinder locomotive in 1919. Designated N1, the new design was an attempt to increase the operational flexibility and power of the SECR 2-6-0 without substantially increasing axle loading. Holcroft's previous employment as an engineer involved with the GWR's 4300 class meant that the N1 used the same Churchward features as the N class to aid standardisation and the manufacture of parts. These included the use of long-travel valves for free running at speed, right-hand drive in the cab and 5 ft 6 in (1,680 mm) driving wheels. The retention of the 2-6-0 wheel arrangement meant ample accommodation for the N class' tapered boiler with Belpaire firebox. As with the N class, detail design on the N1 was left to another of Maunsell's assistants, James Clayton, who brought functional Midland Railway influences to the design: the loading gauge-friendly shape of the cab, the tender and the large-diameter smokebox. The smokebox housed a large superheater, regulator valve and snifting (anti-vacuum) valves. The N1 also retained Walschaerts valve gear on both outside cylinders.

The main design differences with the N class included the cab front, exhaust arrangements, and the addition of an extra (inside) cylinder between the frames to drive the centre driving axle. Clayton had revised the layout of the cab front spectacle plates (small windows on the front of the cab) to improve forward visibility. This incorporated two large single panes of glass either side of the boiler instead of the four smaller windows used on the N class. The inside cylinder was to be actuated by Holcroft's design of conjugated valve gear, which consisted of mechanical links fitted to both sets of outside Walschaerts gear, eliminating the need for a separate set of valve gear between the frames to operate the inside cylinder. The result would be a reduction in weight and the amount of mechanical equipment in this inaccessible part of the locomotive.

Holcroft's valve gear design was also an attempt to address the problems associated with Gresley's conjugated valve gear, which was prone to variations in valve events caused by heat expansion of the valve spindles within the pistons. The design utilised the motion of the outside valve rods (the rods transmitting the motion of the driving axles to the valves, such as the combination lever) instead, although the restricted space between the back of the outside cylinders and the front driving wheels made it impossible to locate the rocking arms controlling the conjugating mechanism in the vicinity. Holcroft's solution was to move the mechanism to a position above the pony truck and ahead of the cylinders and link it to the outside valve rods with extension levers, which had to be accommodated within the strict SECR loading gauge tolerances. This necessitated a new design of cylinder block whereby the outside steam chests were set inwards and the size of the cylinders reduced to 16 in × 28 in (406 mm × 711 mm) stroke and diameter. The sides of the outside cylinders consequently sloped inwards towards the top in a configuration similar to GWR 2-cylinder locomotives, thus providing ample space in which to accommodate the extension levers. The inside cylinder and conjugation assembly were set at an incline of 1 in 8 to clear the front pony truck, leaving space for a third set of independent Walschaerts valve gear between the frames should Holcroft's conjugation mechanism prove unreliable in service.

Another issue concerned the strength of the locomotive frames around the cylinders. Taking inspiration from the 3-cylinder locomotives designed by Vincent Raven for the North Eastern Railway, Holcroft suggested that all three cylinders and associated steam passages should be cast in a single block, with rectangular holes cut into the frames to enable the outside cylinders to project through them. However, the SECR's established practice of using outside steam chests on locomotives with outside cylinders prevented this, and the design team resorted to cutting a gap in the frames to accommodate the outside cylinders, which were then secured in place with a bolted splice plate. Production limitations at the Ashford works foundry also prevented the manufacture of a single casting that incorporated all three cylinders. This meant that the cylinder castings were split into two sections, with the left and inside cylinders forming a single unit that would be bolted onto a separate right-hand cylinder casting. Holcroft's new cylinder block design also incorporated a separate saddle casting, a configuration that allowed the N1 cylinder patterns to be used with any diameter of smokebox, creating a standard component with potential applications on future locomotive designs.

=== Prototype ===
The construction of the prototype at Ashford railway works was approved by the SECR management to commence in 1919. However, Ashford works was heavily engaged in tackling a backlog of repair and maintenance work caused by government restrictions during the First World War with little spare capacity for new construction projects, particularly when approval for the construction of the N1 prototype coincided with a priority order for 15 2-cylinder N class locomotives. In consequence, the works backlog meant that only 12 N class locomotives were completed between June 1920 and October 1922.

Seeing little sign of an increase in production capacity at Ashford, Maunsell decided to construct the prototype N1 locomotive from parts intended for use on the next N class locomotive in the batch, No. 822. The outside cylinders were exchanged for the N1 type, which had been machined at the GWR's Swindon railway works following casting at Ashford to quicken construction once the N class frames were modified to accept the new design of cylinder block. This produced a robust chassis capable of supporting both sets of Walschaerts and the Holcroft conjugated valve gear. The latter was provided with grease-gun lubrication points to ease maintenance.

A distinguishing feature of the locomotive was the high-set N class boiler, which was pitched 3.5 in (89 mm) above the frames to accommodate the inside cylinder assembly, potentially exposing the conjugation mechanism to the elements. To prevent corrosion, Maunsell incorporated a vertical metal cover above the front buffer beam to protect the inside cylinder and valve gear assembly, the main visual difference from the N class. Maunsell and Holcroft anticipated that the standard N class chimney would choke the exhaust blast produced by the three cylinders. To mitigate this, a wider-diameter blastpipe was cast for the locomotive and a new smokebox fabricated to accommodate a wide-diameter cast chimney. The rest of the construction process followed the 1919 N1 specification, and the final three members of the order for 15 N class locomotives were built as intended. The N1 prototype was completed in December 1922 and attached to a standard Maunsell 3,500-imperial-gallon (15,911 L) flat-sided Ashford N class tender. It entered service on 24 March 1923 and the boiler pressure was reduced from 200 psi (1.38 MPa) to 180 psi (1.24 MPa) for No. 822's fuel consumption to be compared with that of the 2-cylinder N class during trials.

=== Southern Railway batch ===
The completion of No. 822 coincided with the absorption of the SECR into the newly created Southern Railway in the 1923 Grouping. Maunsell was appointed the CME of the new company and embarked upon a greatly expanded programme of fleet standardisation to replace the inherited "pre-Grouping" designs. In 1924, No. 822 participated in a series of trials to compare the performance of the N, LSWR S15 and LB&SCR K classes when hauling freight trains of 65 loaded wagons between Woking and Eastleigh. Despite achieving the lowest coal consumption per mile of all the designs tested, the N1 prototype cost more to maintain and displayed poor steaming qualities that affected timekeeping. After the trials, No. 822 remained the sole N1 until 1929, when the Southern Railway ordered a batch of five locomotives (Nos. A876–A880). The intention was to increase the availability of the class to complement the newly introduced U1 class passenger locomotives on gauge-restricted routes.

The batch was constructed at Ashford works and incorporated several refinements based upon operational experience with No. 822 and were given boilers set at 200 psi (1.38 MPa). The other change was the discontinuation of the Holcroft valve gear because of the difficulty experienced in acquiring suitable spare parts for the prototype. The Southern Railway had also upgraded the permanent way on many of the former SECR routes by 1929, removing many of the weight restrictions that inspired the use of the Holcroft gear in the first place. Maunsell was therefore free to use three separate sets of Walschaerts valve gear driven by the centre driving wheels and the crank axle, a system that was easier to maintain due to the wide availability of parts.

The new locomotives were completed between March and November 1930. They were noticeably different from the prototype because the Holcroft conjugation mechanism above the outside cylinders was omitted, although the slab-front and angled profile of the outside cylinders was retained. Other variations included a set of footsteps beneath the front buffer beam, reversion to the N class cast chimney design and a revised dome that incorporated the regulator to ease access during routine maintenance. Once complete, Nos. A876–A880 were attached to flat-sided 4,000-imperial-gallon (18,184 L) tenders to increase operational range over the Southern Railway's longer Eastern section routes. No further N1 locomotives were ordered after the completion of No. A880 as the mechanically similar U1 class was capable of undertaking a broader range of tasks. Although intended for intermediate passenger work, the latter's 6 ft (1,830 mm) driving wheels were of little disadvantage when used on slower freight duties.

=== N1 class construction history ===
Year	Batch	Quantity	SECR/SR numbers	Notes
1922	SECR	1	822	SECR N class locomotive No. 822 modified during construction to 3-cylinder arrangement, became N1 prototype
1930	Southern Railway	5	A876–A880	All built with three separate sets of Walschaerts valve gear

== Operational details ==
The N1 class prototype was initially based at Bricklayers Arms shed for tests on services over the Eastern section. No. 822 became a familiar sight on freight workings between the Hither Green marshalling yard and Paddock Wood and on passenger trains between Tonbridge and Charing Cross, as increased train lengths on these duties had taxed the ex-SECR 4-4-0 and 0-6-0 designs. This allocation also provided an opportunity for comparing performance against the 2-cylinder N class. The tests were complete by December 1923 and No. 822 was moved to Ashford shed and used on passenger services to Charing Cross. In 1925, No. 822 was re-allocated to Bricklayers Arms shed from where it was used on the gauge-restricted Tonbridge–Hastings line for the first time. No. 822 proved ideal for this line but was again re-allocated to Redhill for trials over the difficult undulating route to Reading in 1928.

Despite the high maintenance costs and steaming difficulties revealed during the 1924 freight trials, the N1 prototype compared favourably against the N class, allowing the Southern Railway's management to order the final five locomotives in 1929. Nos. A876–A880 were initially allocated to the Central section shed at New Cross, from where they were regularly used on through expresses from the LMS between Willesden Junction and Brighton and services to Hastings and Bognor Regis. Three of the class were moved to Tonbridge shed in 1931 to operate over the Hastings line whilst the other three remained at New Cross. The class was re-allocated in 1935 with three based at Eastbourne on the Central section to haul through trains to the GWR and the London, Midland and Scottish Railway (LMS). By 1939 the class was divided between New Cross, Stewarts Lane and Tonbridge sheds.

As with the preceding N class, the N1s were capable of hauling heavy loads at moderate speeds, a useful attribute that was exploited throughout the Second World War. They were mostly used on freight trains on both Central and Eastern sections although No. 1822 was recorded hauling a 17–carriage troop special over the Redhill to Reading line in April 1942. The entire class operated in the Hastings area during the build-up to Operation Overlord in 1944. On 3 May, No. 1878 was targeted by a German fighter near Rye but was undamaged. The entire class came into British Railways' ownership in 1948 and was used on the Southern Region.

=== Performance of the N1 class and modifications ===
As a development of the N class, the N1 class represented the next step forward for the British 2-6-0 concept, creating a capable workhorse equally adept at hauling passenger and freight traffic. The prototype proved economical in service as it used 10 per cent less coal than the N class, but used 11 per cent more water. However, the N1 design proved capable of fast speeds; No. 822 reached 79 mph (127 km/h) during trials between Charing Cross and Tonbridge in 1923. Once run-in, No. 822 became popular amongst its regular crews as they favoured the way the three cylinders balanced cyclic forces on the driving axle. This resulted in improved riding characteristics on the footplate at low speeds whilst reducing mechanical wear and the effect of hammerblow on the track. The Holcroft valve gear also meant that No. 822 was a comparatively light locomotive that could be used on weight-restricted routes.

Although successful at overcoming the problems associated with the Gresley conjugated valve gear, the Holcroft variant used on No. 822 suffered under a poor maintenance regime caused by the difficulty and expense of producing non-standard spare parts at Ashford works. The main problems associated with the Holcroft gear included inadequate lubrication of the moving parts and the whipping of the conjugation levers connecting the inside cylinder to the outside motion while running at high speeds, which caused uneven steam distribution to the cylinders. In this respect, the N1 prototype offered little advantage over the simpler 2-cylinder Ns and the locomotive was rarely used on long-distance runs on the Western section. Few modifications were made to the prototype before 1929, although boiler pressure was increased to the full 200 psi (1.38 MPa) operating pressure in June 1925.

The introduction of Nos. A876–A880 into service allowed No. A822 to be withdrawn for rebuilding with three separate sets of Walschaerts valve gear in August 1931. Other modifications included moving the regulator valve from the smokebox to a new N class-type dome to ease access during routine maintenance and the addition of a front footstep behind the bufferbeam. Despite the opportunity to upgrade to the 4,000-imperial-gallon (18,184 L) tender attached to the new class members, No. A822 retained its smaller-capacity 3,500-imperial-gallon (15,911 L) flat-sided Ashford tender. The result of the various modifications was a heavier locomotive, although it now benefited from upgraded track on the Eastern section and the interchange of standardised parts that reduced the time needed to complete repairs. The rebuilt locomotive emerged from Ashford works as No. 1822 in October 1931. Although the N1s displayed little overall improvement over the N class, they proved ideal for the gauge-restricted Hastings route, where their narrower profile allowed them to operate through narrow bridges and tunnels, and their power enabled them to haul heavier trains than the predominant ex-SECR 4-4-0 and 0-6-0s.

The last modification of the class undertaken by Maunsell was the gradual introduction of small smoke deflector plates from 1934. These were fitted to improve driver visibility as a result of smoke deflection experiments made on the King Arthur class between 1926 and 1927. Maunsell retired from the Southern Railway in 1937 and his replacement was Oliver Bulleid. Despite making various modifications to the steam circuit on other Maunsell classes, Bulleid saw no reason to make such drastic alterations to the N1 class. As a result, the final set of modifications made under Southern Railway ownership was made after the Second World War and included the removal of superfluous smokebox-mounted anti-vacuum snifting valves and the replacement of the wide-diameter N1 chimney with the U1 type to improve draughting on the prototype; the standard N class chimneys of the other five were also replaced. The class was well-used by British Railways over both Central and Eastern sections between 1948 and 1962 and justified the fitting of Automatic Warning System (AWS) equipment in 1959 alongside the N class.

=== Withdrawal ===
Suitable work for the class began to decline under British Railways ownership after the widening of bridges and tunnels on the Hastings line, which enabled Bulleid's powerful Q1 class 0-6-0 to be used on freight trains between Hastings and Tonbridge. Following the completion of the Kent Coast electrification in 1959, the class was congregated at Tonbridge shed alongside members of the U1 class to haul local services throughout the Central section. The reduction of work over the Brighton Main Line and the prevalence of the N class precipitated another move to Stewarts Lane shed in London. However, with remaining work being allocated to Bulleid's Light Pacifics, the class was withdrawn from service in November 1962.

== Livery and numbering ==
=== SECR and Southern Railway ===
No. 822 was completed before Grouping, and initially ran in the SECR's unlined dark grey livery with white lettering and numbering. It was repainted at the same time as the resetting of the boiler pressure in June 1925, in a dark olive green livery. The green was complemented with plain white lining, black borders and primrose yellow markings. This livery was also applied to the five locomotives built in 1930. During the Second World War, when labour and paint were in short supply, the class was gradually repainted in matt black. The repainting took place during essential maintenance visits to Ashford works, and included the application of Bulleid's "Sunshine" yellow block lettering and numerals on both tender and cabside. This livery was gradually replaced with gloss black between 1945 and 1947.

The prototype was constructed as part of a batch of 15 N class locomotives ordered by the SECR and became No. 822 within this series. When repainted to Maunsell's dark olive green livery, a prefix "A" was applied to the number to denote a locomotive allocated for overhaul at Ashford. The five locomotives constructed by the Southern Railway between March and November 1930 were numbered A876–A880. Shortly thereafter the prefix was dropped and 1000 added to the numbers as part of a general renumbering of Southern Railway locomotive stock; thus on the rebuilding of the prototype in 1930 it became 1822. The other five members of the class became Nos. 1876–1880.

=== British Railways ===
The class was absorbed by British Railways in 1948, and like their N class counterparts were given the power classification 4MT in 1949. Under British Railways ownership, the class was reclassified from 4MT to 4P5FB in 1953; the "B" denoting the brake power rating when used on unfitted (non-vacuum braked) goods trains. The locomotives at first retained their Southern Railway livery, but No. 1876 was the first locomotive to emerge from Ashford works with "British Railways" painted on the tender in Gill Sans lettering. From 1949 to 1950 N1 class locomotives were gradually repainted in the British Railways mixed-traffic lined black livery with red, cream and grey lining and the British Railways crest on the tender. Numbering was changed to the British Railways standard numbering system: the prototype became No. 31822 and the 1930 batch was allocated the series 31876–31880.

== Operational assessment ==
The N1 was a capable class of mixed-traffic locomotive that could operate over the Southern Railway's gauge-restricted routes and was noted by crews for its comfortable riding qualities. The class also provided Maunsell and his assistants with a precedent for other compact 3-cylinder locomotive designs and formed a mechanical template for the Southern Railway's K1 class tank engine of 1925. However, the prototype offered little improvement in performance over the N class when tested on non-restricted routes, which led to an initial reluctance within the management of the Southern Railway to authorise batch construction. This meant that the non-standard Holcroft valve gear proved expensive to maintain because of the consequent lack of spare parts.

The use of three separate sets of valve gear on the 1930 batch eased maintenance and improved the standardisation of parts. The prototype was rebuilt to the same specification as the 1930 batch, creating a robust workhorse capable of a good turn of speed when working heavy passenger and freight trains. The revised valve gear layout was subsequently applied to the 3-cylinder U1 and V class designs. The relatively early withdrawal of the N1s pre-dated the era of preservationists buying withdrawn locomotives from scrap dealers or British Railways, and consequently no examples of the N1 class survived into preservation.
