= List of SECR K and SR K1 class locomotives =

A list of the names and numbers of the SECR K and SR K1 classes of 2-6-4 tank engines that formed the River class: locomotives initially running on the South Eastern and Chatham Railway (SECR), and subsequently operated by its successor, the Southern Railway (SR) from 1923. The majority of the class consisted of 2-cylinder locomotives built to an SECR design by Richard Maunsell, but one 3-cylinder version, the K1 class, was constructed by the Southern Railway in 1925. They were given the names of various rivers by the Southern Railway in a publicity measure to advertise the area that the railway served.

In 1928 the class was converted to the 2-cylinder U class and 3-cylinder U1 class 2-6-0 specifications after crews reported instability when running fast over the lightly laid rails of the former SECR network. The poor running culminated in the 1927 Sevenoaks railway accident, following which the locomotives were withdrawn. Once rebuilt, the former members of the K and K1 classes subsequently lost their names due to the bad publicity attached to them after this accident. All the rebuilt locomotives saw service with British Railways (BR), and all were withdrawn from service by 1966.

== Tables of locomotive details ==
=== SECR and Southern Railway-built K class 2-cylinder locomotives ===
SECR No.	SR No (before/after rebuilding)	BR No. (as U class)	Name	Builder	Date built	Date Rebuilt as U class	Rebuilt at	Withdrawn	Notes
790	A790/1790	31790	River Avon	Ashford	June 1917	June 1928	Eastleigh	May 1965	
—	A791/1791	31791	River Adur	Armstrong Whitworth	May 1925	July 1928	Eastleigh	June 1966	
—	A792/1792	31792	River Arun	Armstrong Whitworth	May 1925	July 1928	Eastleigh	September 1964	
—	A793/1793	31793	River Ouse	Armstrong Whitworth	May 1925	June 1928	Eastleigh	May 1964	
—	A794/1794	31794	River Rother	Armstrong Whitworth	May 1925	June 1928	Eastleigh	June 1963	
—	A795/1795	31795	River Medway	Armstrong Whitworth	June 1925	June 1928	Eastleigh	June 1963	
—	A796/1796	31796	River Stour	Armstrong Whitworth	June 1925	July 1928	Eastleigh	January 1964	
—	A797/1797	31797	River Mole	Armstrong Whitworth	June 1925	June 1928	Ashford	January 1964	
—	A798/1798	31798	River Wey	Armstrong Whitworth	June 1925	August 1928	Ashford	September 1964	
—	A799/1799	31799	River Test	Armstrong Whitworth	June 1925	July 1928	Ashford	February 1965	
—	A800/1800	31800	River Cray	Brighton	July 1926	December 1928	Ashford	October 1965	Involved in the 1927 Sevenoaks railway accident
—	A801/1801	31801	River Darenth	Brighton	July 1926	July 1928	Ashford	June 1964	
—	A802/1802	31802	River Cuckmere	Brighton	August 1926	July 1928	Ashford	September 1964	
—	A803/1803	31803	River Itchen	Brighton	August 1926	June 1928	Brighton	March 1966	
—	A804/1804	31804	River Tamar	Brighton	September 1926	June 1928	Brighton	June 1964	
—	A805/1805	31805	River Camel	Brighton	October 1926	March 1928	Ashford	July 1963	
—	A806/1806	31806	River Torridge	Brighton	October 1926	June 1928	Brighton	January 1964	Converted to a U class locomotive, preserved on the Swanage Railway; Operational
—	A807/1807	31807	River Axe	Brighton	November 1926	September 1928	Brighton	January 1964	
—	A808/1808	31808	River Char	Brighton	November 1926	July 1928	Brighton	January 1964	
—	A809/1809	31809	River Dart	Brighton	December 1926	July 1928	Brighton	January 1966	

=== Southern Railway-built K1 class 3-cylinder locomotive ===
SR No. (before/after rebuilding)	BR No. (as U1 class)	Name	Builder	Date built	Date Rebuilt as U1 class	Rebuilt at	Withdrawn	Notes
A890/1890	31890	River Frome	Ashford	December 1925	June 1928	Ashford	June 1963	U1 class prototype

== Unbuilt locomotives ==
A further 20 K class locomotives were projected, but the order was cancelled after the derailment of No. A800 River Cray at Sevenoaks, Kent in August 1927 and subsequent withdrawal of the class for rebuilding. The projected names were selected as thus:

A610 River Beaulieu, A611 River Blackwater, A612 River Bourne, A613 River Bray, A614 River Creedy A615 River Ebble, A616 River Eden, A617 River Anton, A618 River Hamble, A619 River Taw, A620 River Lymington, A621 River Parret, A622 River Medina, A623 River Exe, A624 River Allen, A625 River Seaton, A626 River Tiddy, A627 River Tavy, A628 River Lynher, A629 River Titchfield.

These unused K class numbers, but not the names, were later allocated to the first production batch of the U class 2-6-0 from 1928. Although a batch of ten K1 class locomotives was also ordered during 1927, no names had been allocated before cancellation. Out of these unbuilt K class members, nos. A618 and A625 are preserved as U Class locomotives

== Location link ==
- Swanage Railway
