= Footplate (disambiguation) =

Footplate may refer to:

- Footplate (platform), the platform on which locomotive drivers and stokers stand to control a steam locomotive.
- Footplate of the stapes, the base of one of the ossicles of the middle ear.
