= Harold Holcroft =

British steam locomotive engineer

Harold Holcroft (12 February 1882 – 15 February 1973) was an English railway and mechanical engineer who worked for the Great Western Railway (GWR), the South Eastern and Chatham Railway (SECR) and the Southern Railway (SR).

At the GWR, Holcroft helped the Chief Mechanical Engineer (CME), George Jackson Churchward, design the 4300 class 2-6-0 Moguls, and took the design principles for this class of locomotive with him when he moved to the SECR. Here, he worked as Assistant to Richard Maunsell and was involved with the design of the Maunsell Moguls, transferring to the Southern Railway when it was created by the amalgamation of the SECR with other railways at Grouping in 1923. After Maunsell's retirement in 1937, Holcroft continued to work for the Southern Railway under Oliver Bulleid until his retirement in 1946.

== Early life, GWR service and Holcroft conjugated valve gear ==
Holcroft was born in Wolverhampton and undertook a premium apprenticeship at the Wolverhampton works of the GWR (managed by his uncle Ernest Edward Lucy). He worked in the assembly shop and the drawing office to get an all-round feel for railway life, giving him the experience to generate his own ideas. His first patent was filed at the age of 18, which brought Holcroft to the attention of Churchward and enabled him to transfer to Swindon works when his apprenticeship was completed. As one of Churchward's rising prodigies in the heyday of GWR locomotive development, Holcroft helped with the design of several of Churchward's locomotives, notably the 4300 class 2-6-0. In 1909, he patented a form of conjugated valve gear to drive the valves of a three-cylinder engine from only two sets of valve gear.

== Service with the SECR and the Southern Railway ==
When the Churchward development programme of new locomotives began to slow down, Holcroft sought employment with a railway still in need of original design work. He joined Richard Maunsell's design team as an Assistant, participating in the latter's contributions to the SECR and Southern Railway's motive power.

He collaborated with Nigel Gresley to develop the Gresley conjugated valve gear for 3-cylinder locomotives as fitted to LNER 3 cylinder locomotives. Holcroft continued to develop this mechanism by driving the middle cylinder gear of a steam locomotive from the outside cylinder combination levers, as opposed to Gresley's method of using direct transmission from the front valve spindles. This was necessary in the case of the SECR / SR Moguls because there was insufficient space for Holcroft's original gear to fit between the cylinder leading wheels and first drivers. Holcroft's method had a number of advantages. The Gresley design of conjugated valve gear suffered from variations in valve events brought about by heat expansion of the valve spindles and flexing of the combination lever – even after considerable re-design of the lever and pivot bracket, affecting the valve events when the locomotive was under way. By using the combination lever assembly to drive the middle cylinder, Holcroft managed to circumvent these problems. Subsequently the problem of flexure and lost motion caused the gear to be removed from the SR Moguls in 1931, to be replaced by a third set of Walschaerts gear, as allowed for in the original design.

Holcroft's ideas for conjugated valve gear were incorporated into Maunsell's N1 class, K1 class and U1 class three-cylinder locomotives. Holcroft was involved in trials of the Anderson recompression system between 1930 and 1935. He stayed with the Southern Railway after Maunsell's retirement in 1937 to work with Oliver Bulleid.

== Retirement ==
Holcroft retired from the Southern Railway in 1946, and worked on periodicals for the Institution of Civil Engineers. He died in Tadworth, Surrey on 15 February 1973. Holcroft wrote a book, Locomotive Adventure about his experiences regarding the development of steam locomotives in Britain. He was also editor of Railway Engineering Abstracts (some of these abstracts were used for the later material in Steam Locomotive Development). A collection of Holcroft's papers is archived at the National Railway Museum, and includes the manuscript for a second autobiography entitled Life with Locos.

== Patents ==
- GB190428183, published 23 November 1905, Improved means for use in operating continuous brakes by a vacuum or compressed air
- GB190907859, published 25 November 1909, Improvements in or relating to valve gears for engines worked by fluid pressure

== Bibliography ==
- Holcroft, H. (September 1946). "Condensing by compression a locomotive experiment". The Engineer (182): 202–203, 227–229, 248–249.
- —— (1953). The Armstrongs of the Great Western: Their Times, Surroundings & Contemporaries. London: Railway World.
- —— (1957). An Outline of Great Western Locomotive Practice 1837–1947. Locomotive Publishing Co.
- —— (1965). Locomotive Adventure: Fifty Years With Steam. London: Ian Allan.
- —— (1965). Locomotive Adventure (volume II): Running Experiences. London: Ian Allan.
- —— (1971) [1957]. An Outline of Great Western Locomotive Practice 1837–1947. Shepperton: Ian Allan. ISBN 0-7110-0228-2.
