= Snifting valve =

Anti-vacuum valve in steam locomotives

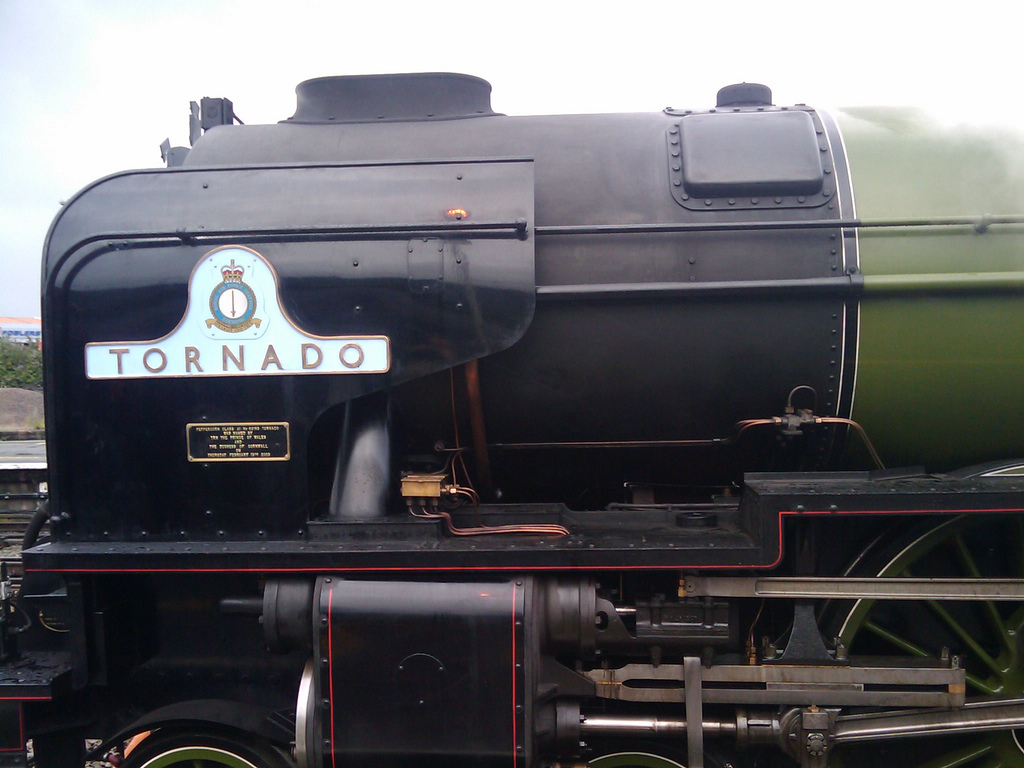
LNER Peppercorn A1 class Tornado The snifting valve is the small mushroom directly behind the chimney. The square cover beneath is another distinctive LNER feature, covering the end of the superheater header.

A snifting valve (sometimes snifter valve) is an automatic anti-vacuum valve used in a steam locomotive when coasting. The word Snift imitates the sound made by the valve.

== Overview ==
When the driver shuts off the steam to the cylinders of a steam locomotive while it is in motion, the moving pistons could create a partial vacuum in the cylinders. This would give rise to two problems. Firstly, the pumping action would absorb energy and prevent the engine from coasting freely. Secondly, when the exhaust valve opened, soot and cinders from the smokebox could be sucked down the exhaust pipe and into the valve chest or cylinder, causing damage. (The exhaust is open to the smokebox because in normal running the exhaust steam is sent through the blastpipe to draw the fire and eject the combustion products from the chimney.) These problems are avoided by using snifting valves to allow air to be drawn into the cylinder. On railways which did not use snifting valves, drivers were instructed to keep the regulator slightly open when coasting to avoid creating a vacuum.

== Construction ==
The valve is usually either a flat disc or a poppet valve which may be either opened or closed by gravity. In one configuration the valve is lifted onto its seat by steam pressure and falls away under gravity when steam is shut off. This allows air to be drawn freely through it. Alternatively, the valve rests on its seat under gravity and is lifted by inward air flow, which can give rise to a characteristic rattle when a locomotive is coasting.

== Location ==
The snifting valves may be mounted directly on the cylinders or steam chests. The drawback of this arrangement is that they admit cold air which cools the cylinders and leads to condensation when the steam is turned on again.

If a superheater is fitted, one or two snifting valves may be mounted on the "wet" side of the superheater header. This causes air to be drawn through the superheater and heated so that it keeps the cylinders warm. Different railways had different ideas about the merits of drawing air through the superheater elements when coasting.

== UK railways ==
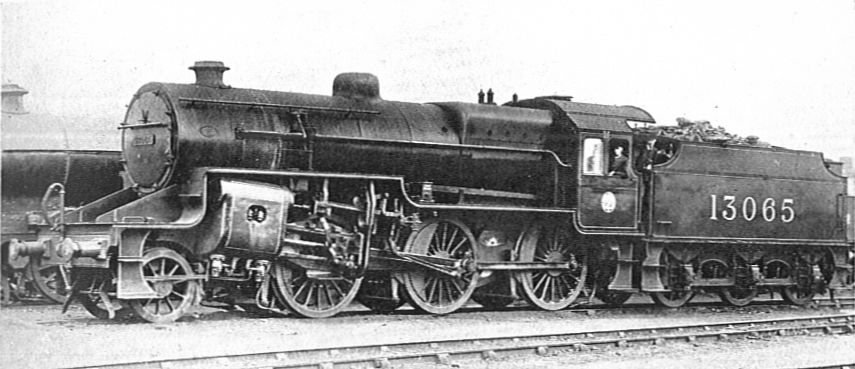
LMS Crab, showing cylinder-mounted snifting valves

UK railway companies did not agree on the merits of snifting valves. The London and North Eastern Railway used them very widely. The Southern Railway used them for a while but later removed them.

The probable explanation for this diversity is that snifting valves were useful as long as steam temperatures were relatively low. As locomotive development proceeded, larger superheaters were fitted and steam temperatures increased. When the locomotive was coasting, the air passing from the superheater to the cylinders became so hot that it oxidised the cylinder oil and interfered with lubrication. At this point, most railways decided to abandon snifting valves.

== Other uses ==
With somewhat different functions, snifting valves were also used in atmospheric steam engines, hydraulic rams and with residential well-pumps. They are not generally used in later stationary steam engines, road engines, or marine engines.

== See also ==
- Steam locomotive components
