= Gresley conjugated valve gear =

Type of mechanism for controlling steam flow in a reciprocating steam engine

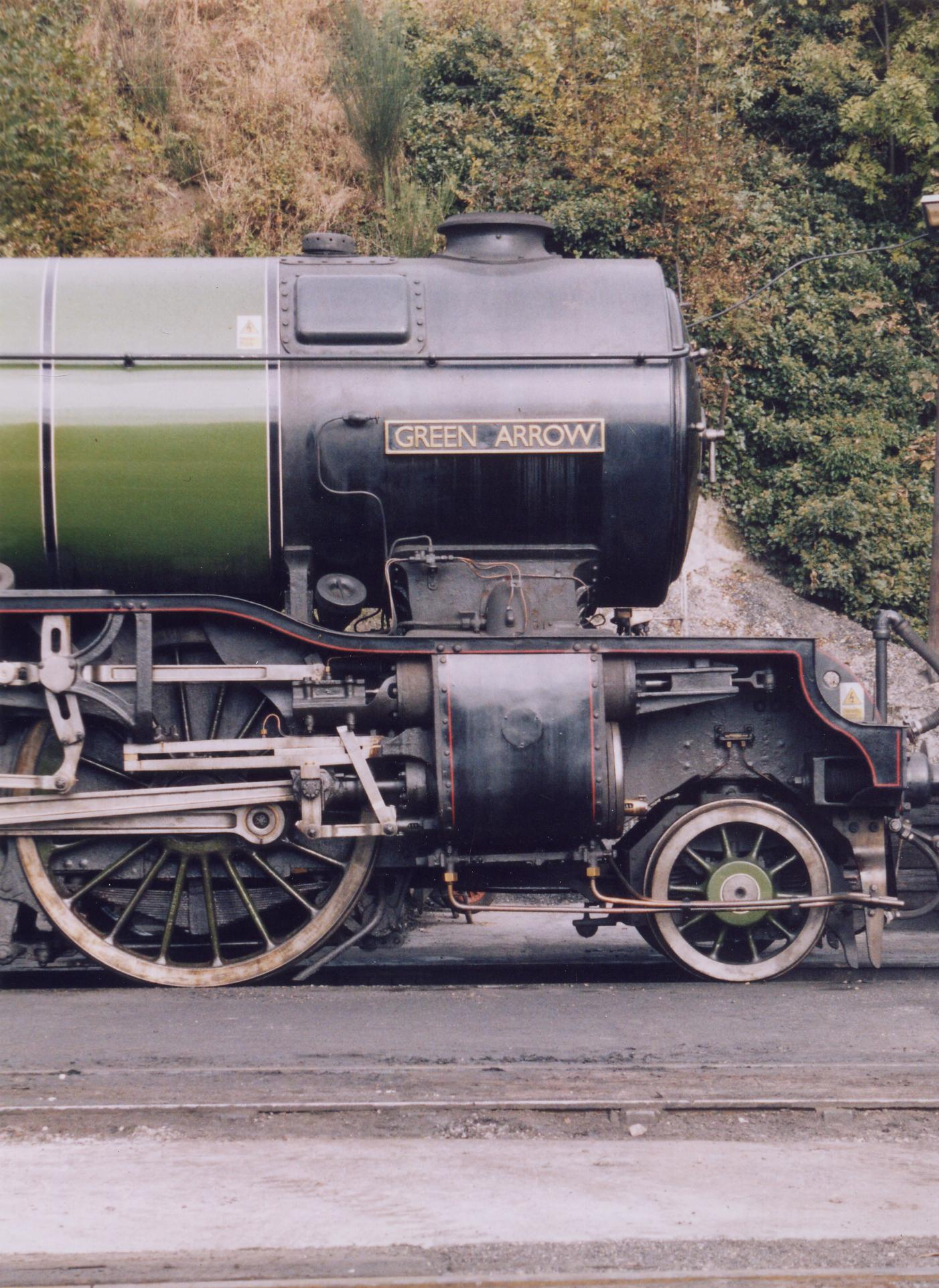
LNER Class V2 4771 Green Arrow. Note Gresley conjugated valve gear located ahead of the piston valves, driven from the valve spindles

The Gresley conjugated valve gear is a valve gear for steam locomotives designed by Sir Nigel Gresley, chief mechanical engineer of the LNER, assisted by Harold Holcroft. It enables a three-cylinder locomotive to operate on with only the two sets of valve gear for the outside cylinders, and derives the valve motion for the inside cylinder from them by means of levers (the "2 to 1" or "conjugating" lever and the "equal" lever). The gear is sometimes known as the Gresley-Holcroft gear, acknowledging Holcroft's major contributions to its development.

== Operation ==
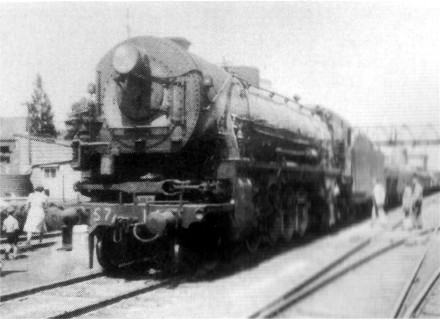
New South Wales Government Railways D57 class 4-8-2, with Gresley conjugated gear visible at front below the smokebox. The longer 2 to 1 Lever is located on the right side of the locomotive, and the shorter Equal Lever on the left side.

The Gresley conjugated gear is effectively an adding machine, where the position of the valve for the inside cylinder is the sum of the positions of the two outside cylinders, but reversed in direction. It can also be thought of as a rocking lever between one outside cylinder and the inside cylinder, as is common on 4-cylinder steam locomotives, but with the pivot point being moved back and forth by a lever from the other outside cylinder.

If we approximate the motion of each valve by a sine wave — if we say the position of a valve in its back-and-forth travel is exactly proportional to the sine of the "driver angle", once we have set the zero point of driver angle at the position it needs to be for that valve — then the mathematics is simple. The position of the valve that is pinned to the long end of the 2-to-1 lever is $\scriptstyle \sin \; \theta$, while the positions of the other two valves are supposed to be $\scriptstyle \sin (\theta + 120^ \circ)$ and $\scriptstyle \sin (\theta - 120^ \circ)$. The position of the short end of the 2-to-1 lever is $\scriptstyle - \tfrac {1}{2} \sin \theta$ —which, it turns out, is midway between $\scriptstyle \sin (\theta + 120^ \circ)$ and $\scriptstyle \sin (\theta - 120^ \circ)$ for any value of $\scriptstyle \;\! \theta$. So a 1-to-1 lever pivoted on the short arm of the 2-to-1 lever will do the trick.

== Crank angles ==
Locomotives with Gresley valve gear must have the three pistons operating at precisely 120 degree intervals. (Different spacings could be accommodated by different lever proportions, if there were any advantage to a spacing other than 120-120-120.) In order for the inside connecting rod to clear the leading coupled axle, the inside cylinder of a locomotive with Gresley valve gear is typically positioned higher than the outside cylinders and angled downward. To maintain a smooth flow of torque, the crank angles are offset from equal 120 degree spacing to compensate for the angle of the inside cylinder (e.g. 120/113/127 degrees). The resultant timing of the blast from steam exiting the cylinders gives these three-cylinder locomotives a regular, distinctive exhaust beat.

== Problems ==
There were a number of issues with the Gresley gear. Because the conjugation apparatus was mounted at the opposite end of the valve spindles from the valve gear, as the valve spindles lengthened with the heat of steam in the cylinders the valve timing would be affected, and the gear would need to be removed before it was possible to remove valves for maintenance. However, the B17 Class "Footballer"/"Sandringham" 4-6-0s avoided this particular problem by being designed with the conjugated gear behind, rather than in front of, the cylinders. The main difficulty with this valve gear was that at high speeds, inertial forces caused the long conjugating lever to bend or "whip". This had the effect of causing the middle cylinder to operate at a longer cutoff than the outer cylinders, therefore producing a disproportionate share of the total power output, leading to increased wear of the middle big end. Sustained high speed running could sometimes cause the big end to wear rapidly enough that the increased travel afforded to the middle piston by the increased play in the bearing was enough to knock the ends off the middle cylinder. This happened during the 113 miles per hour (200 km/h) run of "Silver Fox".

Although the problem could be contained in a peacetime environment with regular maintenance and inspections, it proved to be poorly suited to the rigors of heavy running and low maintenance levels of World War II. This gave rise to big-end problems on the centre cylinder connecting rod on the famous A4 class of streamlined Pacifics and many of these locomotives were fitted with a reduced diameter piston and had the inside cylinder sleeved down as a temporary measure. LNER Class A4 4468 Mallard suffered centre cylinder big-end damage (indicated to the driver by the fracture of a "stink bomb" attached to the bearing, which fractures during overheating of the white metal) during its world record run and was forced to limp back to its depot for repairs afterwards. Gresley's successor at the LNER, Edward Thompson, was critical of this particular valve gear. As well as introducing new two-cylinder designs, he set about rebuilding Gresley locomotives with separate sets of Walschaerts valve gear for each cylinder. Under later British Railways ownership, the application of former Great Western Railway workshop practices for precise alignment of the valve gear and in the manufacture and lubrication of the inside big end bearing effectively solved the problems.

== North America, Australia and New Zealand ==
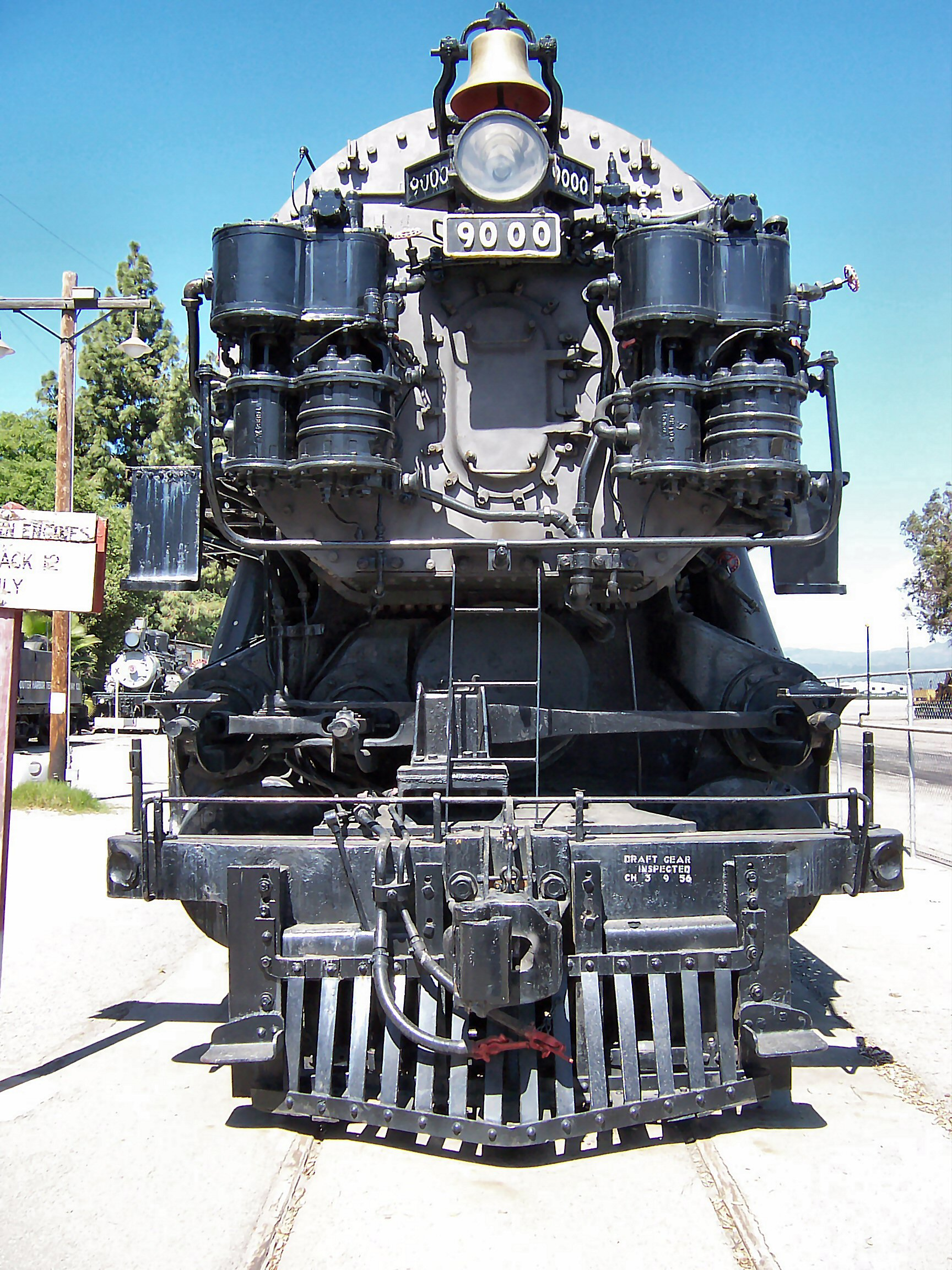
The third cylinder and Gresley gear are visible below the smokebox of this 4-12-2.

Gresley conjugated valve gear was used by the American Locomotive Company under license for the 4-12-2 and 4-10-2 locomotives, the Union Pacific 9000 class, built for the Union Pacific Railroad between 1926 and 1930. These were the largest locomotives to use this valve gear. It was also used in Australia for the Victorian Railways S class 4-6-2 of 1928 and New South Wales Government Railways D57 class 4-8-2 of 1929.

As in the UK, the mechanism was not without its problems. Some of the Union Pacific 9000 class locomotives were converted to a "double Walschaerts" valve gear, while later examples were built with roller bearings for the moving parts of the Gresley mechanism. In Australia, the VR S class Pacifics avoided many of the middle cylinder problems that beset Gresley by placing a 'set' in the axle of the leading driving wheels, thus allowing all three cylinders to be in the same horizontal plane. Later VR and NSWGR three cylinder locomotive designs used alternative mechanisms to the Gresley system in an effort to overcome its high maintenance overhead. The Victorian Railways H class of 1941 was fitted with a German Henschel und Sohn conjugated valve gear mechanism which was judged to be superior to the Gresley system.

In New South Wales the D58 class of 1950 replaced the long conjugating lever with a transverse rod, which used a rack and pinion on the right valve stem to rotate a transverse rod, which through a second rack and pinion gave motion to the equal lever pivot. While in theory an improvement over the Gresley system, this proved in practice to be even more problematic.

Gresley valve gear was used on the NZR G class Beyer-Garrett six-cylinder locomotives supplied to the New Zealand Railways in 1928. The manufacturer Beyer Peacock advised against the three/six-cylinder option with Gresley gear but it was required by G S Lynde the NZR CME. These three articulated locomotives were not a success, and they were rebuilt into six "Pacific" locomotives.

== Japan ==
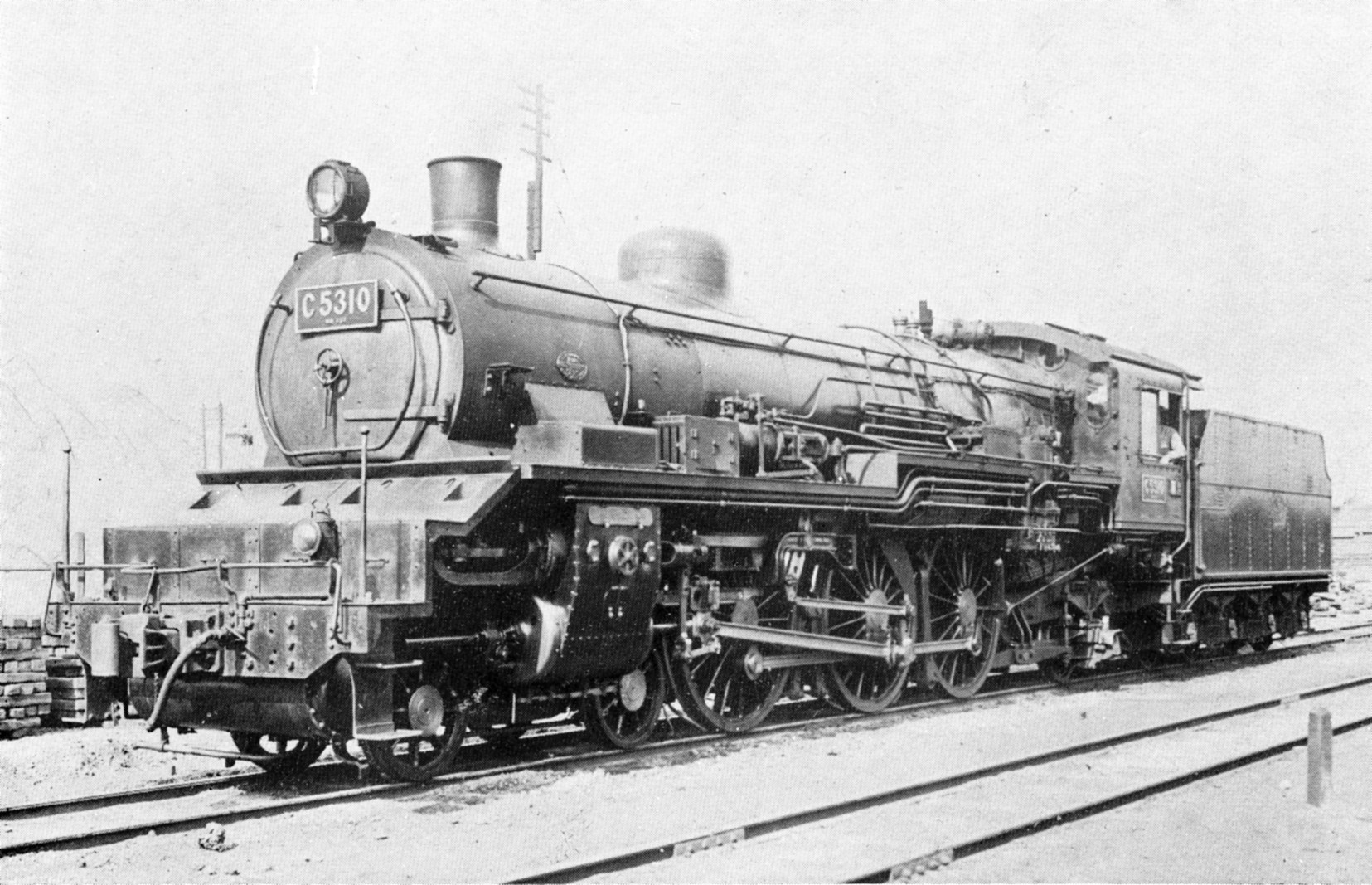
C53 10, January 1935

In Japan, the Class C53 locomotive was the only mass-produced type of locomotive to adopt the Gresley gear. Designed by Hideo Shima, 97 of these locomotives were built between 1928 and 1929 to haul Tōkaidō Main Line express services, such as the Tsubame and the Fuji, which connected Tokyo and Osaka, the country’s two largest cities. While they met initial expectations in terms of performance, their mechanical complexity resulted in a short service life, with all locomotives of the class withdrawn by 1950. One example, C53 45, was rescued from the scrapyard in 1961, restored to haul excursion trains, and is now preserved at the Kyoto Railway Museum.

== See also ==
- Holcroft valve gear
- South African Class 18 2-10-2
