= James Clayton (engineer) =

James Clayton MBE (17 November 1872 – 12 October 1946) was an English mechanical engineer who worked extensively on railway locomotives.

Clayton was born in Stockport, Cheshire and attended the Technical School in Manchester and thereafter served an apprenticeship at Beyer Peacock, becoming a draughtsman in their drawing office. After six years in that post he took a position with the South Eastern and Chatham Railway (SECR). In 1904, he left for a year's work with the Motor Manufacturing Company, an automobile manufacturer in Coventry, as their chief draughtsman and assistant works manager.

Following this, he was hired by Cecil Paget, Chief Superintendent of the Midland Railway, to work on his high pressure multi-cylinder locomotive. During his time with the Midland, he spent two years in charge of the casualty and investigation section, and was appointed assistant chief locomotive draughtsman in 1907.

In 1914, he rejoined the SECR and was soon chief locomotive draughtsman. From 1919, he was chief mechanical engineer Richard Maunsell's personal assistant, and later his deputy. When Maunsell became the Southern Railway's CME in the 1923 Grouping, Clayton continued as his deputy.

He was also very active in the Institution of Locomotive Engineers, serving as a member of its council and later a vice president.
