= Footplate =

Part of steam locomotive

A footplate provides the structure on which a locomotive driver and fireman stand in the cab to operate a British or continental European steam locomotive. It comprises a large metal plate that rests on top of the locomotive frame, usually it is covered with wooden floorboards. It takes up the full width of the locomotive cab, and in depth it extends from the front of the cab to the coal bunker on the tender. The cab and other superstructure elements are in turn mounted on it. On some locomotives, the footplate is extended beyond the front of the cab to form a walkway around the boiler – usually referred to as the "running board" or "foot board" – to facilitate inspection and maintenance.

In Britain, the word remains in use as a synonym for the cab or working in the cab, even in the context of diesel and electric locomotives, as in the expression of working on the footplate.

The term can also be applied to the external step along the side of a classical tram.

== National variations ==
Although a footplate was almost universal in British locomotive design, and often in continental European locomotives, it was never a common feature of steam locomotives constructed in North America, and disappeared from Russian locomotives and big-power locomotives in British colonies (or former colonies), Australia and New Zealand during the 20th century. On those locomotives, the boiler and cab were mounted directly on the frame, and the walkway around the boiler – "running board" or "foot board" – was not a structural element.

== Details ==
The footplate has openings cut in it for various purposes. The firebox always extends beneath the footplate. The cylinders are beneath the footplate, and steam pipes pass through holes to them. The reversing gear control for the valve gear also passes through, and in some locomotives part of the valve motion also extends through the footplate.

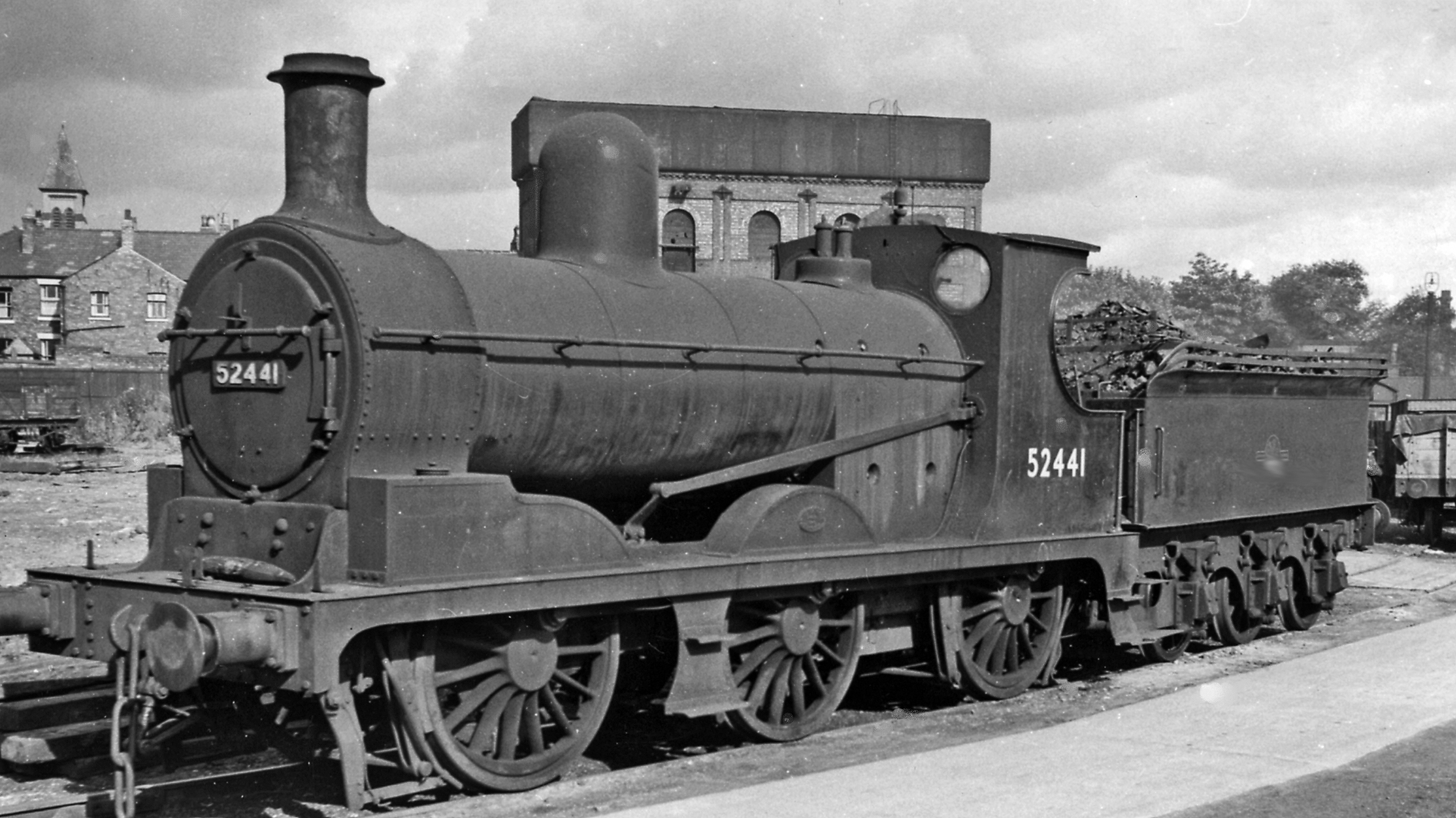
Splashers visible on a British 0-6-0 tender locomotive (note particularly those on the second axle)

On British Railways Standard Locomotives the running plate/board was high enough to clear the wheels; on earlier British locomotives, the tops of driving wheels usually projected through slots in it and were covered by "splashers" – analogous to mudguards on a road vehicle.

== See also ==
- Running board
