= General Jack =

General Jack may refer to:

- Archibald Jack (1874–1939), British Army brigadier general
- James Lochhead Jack (1880–1962), British Army brigadier general
- Samuel S. Jack (1905–1983), U.S. Marine Corps major general
