= Donald Forrester Brown =

New Zealand soldier (1890–1916)

Donald Forrester Brown VC
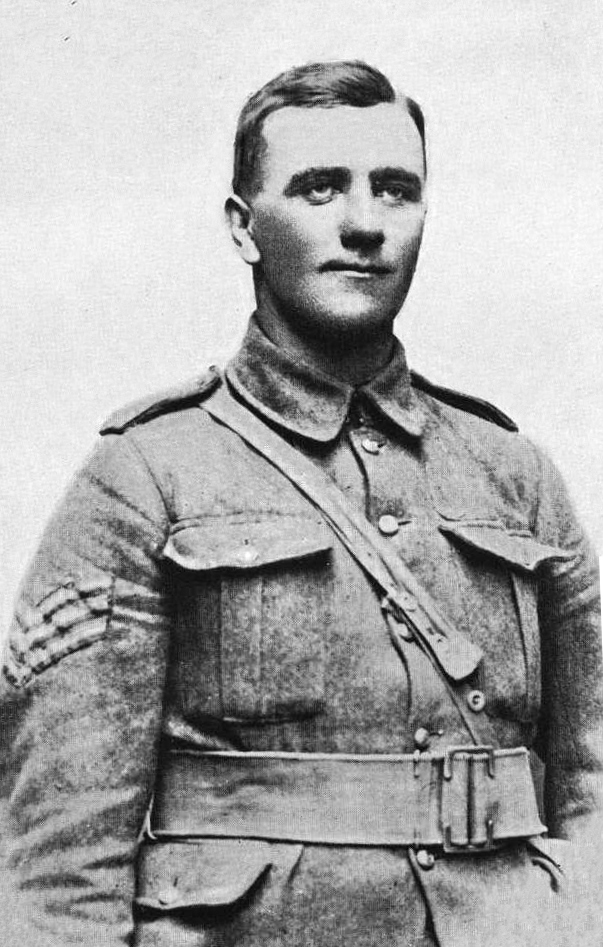
- Born: 23 February 1890; Dunedin, New Zealand
- Died: 1 October 1916 (aged 26) near Eaucourt L'Abbaye, France
- Burial place: Warlencourt British Cemetery, France
- Military career
- Allegiance: New Zealand
- Branch: New Zealand Military Forces
- Service years: 1915–1916
- Rank: Sergeant
- Service number: No. 8/3504
- Units: 2nd Battalion, Otago Infantry Regiment
- Conflicts: First World War; Battle of the Somme; Battle of Flers–Courcelette; Battle of Le Transloy †
- Awards: Victoria Cross

Donald Forrester Brown VC (23 February 1890 – 1 October 1916) was a New Zealand soldier and recipient of the Victoria Cross (VC), the highest award for valour "in the face of the enemy" that can be awarded to British and Commonwealth forces.

Born in Dunedin, Brown was a farmer when the First World War began in 1914. In late 1915, he volunteered for service abroad with the New Zealand Expeditionary Force (NZEF) and was posted to the 2nd Battalion, the Otago Infantry Regiment. He saw action on the Western Front, and was awarded the VC for his actions during the Battle of Flers–Courcelette in September 1916. As he was killed several days later during the Battle of Le Transloy, the award was made posthumously. His VC was the second to be awarded to a soldier serving with the NZEF during the war and was the first earned in an action on the Western Front.

== Early life ==
Donald Forrester Brown was born on 23 February 1890 in Dunedin, New Zealand. He was one of 10 children of Robert Brown, a draper living in Oamaru, and his wife Jessie (née McFarlane). His parents were migrants from Scotland who had married in New Zealand. The youngest boy in his family, Brown was educated at South School and, later, Waitaki Boys' High School in Oamaru. After completing his schooling he took up farming, and by 1913 had purchased a farm at Totara, south of Oamaru.

== First World War ==
When the First World War broke out, Brown continued to work on his farm for a year but then sold it and volunteered for the New Zealand Expeditionary Force (NZEF) on 19 October 1915. He received his training at Trentham Military Camp and embarked for the Middle East in January 1916 with the Ninth Reinforcements. By this time he had been promoted to corporal. The newly formed New Zealand Division was training in Egypt and when Brown arrived, he was posted to the 2nd Battalion, Otago Infantry Regiment. Within a few months he was on the Western Front in France with the rest of the division.

On arrival in France, the New Zealanders were assigned to the Armentières sector of the Western Front. This area was considered to be a "nursery" sector, for introducing inexperienced troops to the Western Front. Brown's battalion was initially positioned to the east of Armentières. Despite being a quiet part of the front, it was still exposed to artillery and sniper fire. The battalion rotated regularly in and out of the front line, as it gained experience in trench warfare. In August 1916, the division began transferring to the Somme sector.

The next month, Brown, by then a sergeant, was involved in the Battle of Flers–Courcelette, part of the Somme Offensive. On the opening day of the battle, 15 September, the 2nd Otago Battalion, alongside the 2nd Auckland Battalion, was ordered to capture a series of German-held trenches from their position south-east of High Wood. The advance commenced at 6:20 am. While the first trench was easily captured with the assistance of effective artillery support, his company came under heavy flanking machine gun fire while advancing to the next trench, which caused many casualties in the company. Brown, together with another soldier, Corporal Jesse Rodgers, attacked one machine gun post, killing the crew and capturing the gun. (Note: Rodgers was awarded the Military Medal for his part in the battle and was later commissioned as a second lieutenant. He died of wounds on 30 July 1917.) The remaining soldiers regrouped and prepared for an attack on the next trench. During a covering artillery barrage they once again came under fire from a machine gun post. Brown was among those who attacked this second machine gun post, swiftly dealing with the threat.

Once the covering barrage lifted, the New Zealanders advanced and captured their next objective, a position known as Switch Trench, by 7:00 am. Some tanks were supposed to have been assisting the infantry but these never appeared. Brown was key in immediately improving the existing defences in preparation against a possible counterattack, by digging new trenches for shelter should Switch Trench be targeted by German artillery. The following day, his battalion was relieved and withdrew from the front line. Brown's company lost 123 men from its initial complement of 180 during the opening day of the battle.

After a period of rest, Brown's battalion moved back into the front line on the evening of 28 September. It was to be one of the assaulting battalions involved in an attack to clear out a German trench system near Eaucourt L'Abbaye as part of the Battle of Le Transloy that commenced on 1 October. On the opening day of the battle, Brown was again involved in the seizing of a German machine gun post at a strongpoint that was holding up the advance. Moving forward on his own, armed only with a pistol, Brown attacked the post. He managed to kill its crew and capture the gun which allowed his fellow troops to attack and capture the strongpoint. While firing at German soldiers as they fled, Brown was shot in the head by a sniper and killed instantly.

== Victoria Cross ==
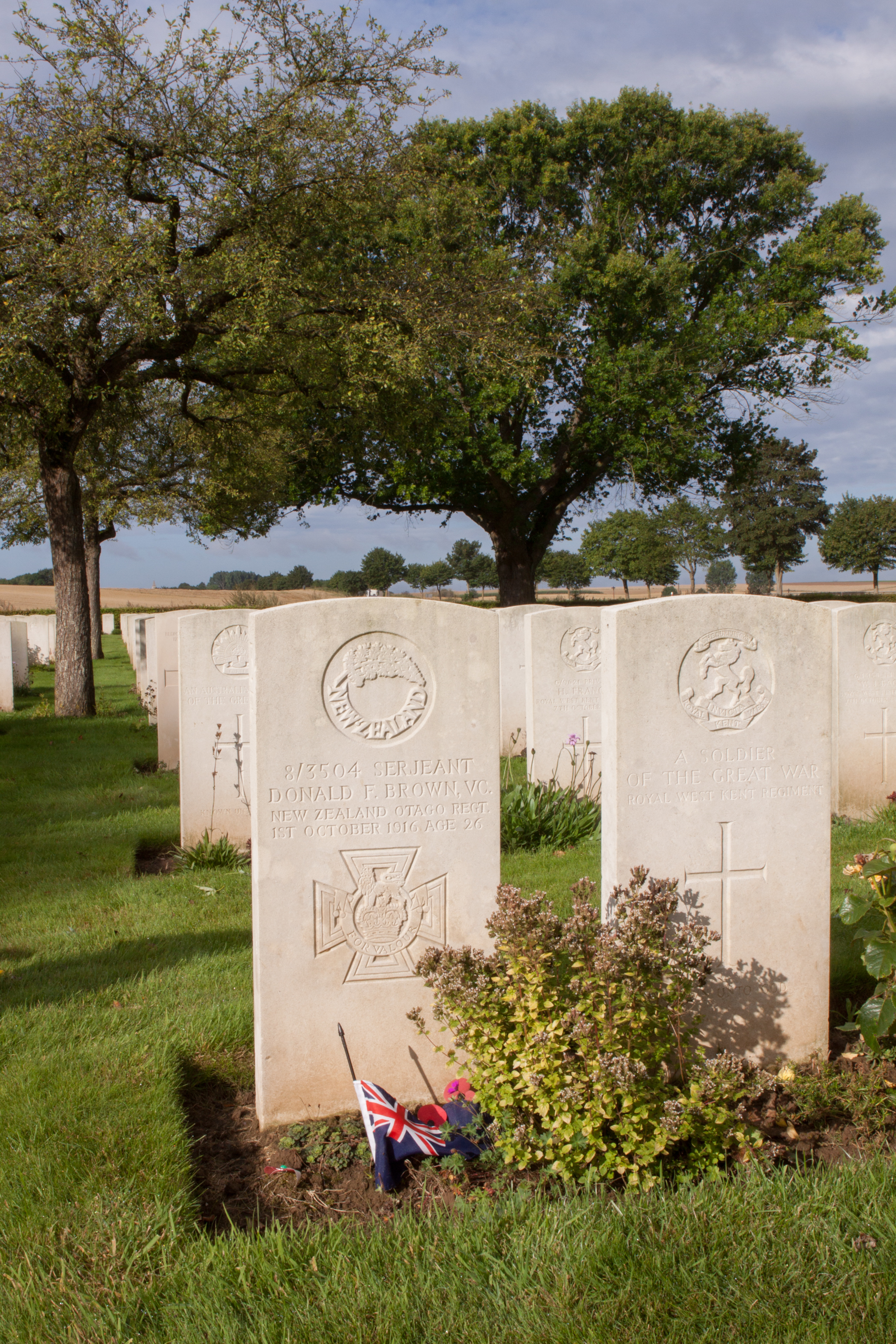
Brown's grave at Warlencourt British Cemetery

Brown's company commander had recommended him for a Distinguished Conduct Medal for his actions on 15 September. In a letter to Brown's father, his battalion commander hoped that the recommendation would be upgraded to a Victoria Cross (VC). The VC, instituted in 1856, was the highest award for valour that could be bestowed on a soldier of the British Empire. The senior leadership of the NZEF were slow to recognise Brown's gallantry and it was not until the officers of his battalion lobbied for a VC nomination that any progress was made. The award of the VC to Brown appeared in The London Gazette on 15 June 1917. The citation read:

For most conspicuous bravery and determination in attack when the company to which he belonged suffered very heavy casualties in officers and men from machine gun fire.

At great personal risk this N.C.O. advanced with a comrade and succeeded in reaching a point within thirty yards of the enemy guns. Four of the gun crew were killed and the gun captured.

The advance of the company was continued till it was again held up by machine gun fire. Again Sjt. Brown and his comrade with great gallantry rushed the gun and killed the crew. After this second position had been won, the company came under very heavy shell fire, and the utter contempt for danger and coolness under fire of this N.C.O. did much to keep up the spirit of his men.

On a subsequent occasion in attack, Sjt Brown showed most conspicuous gallantry. He attacked singlehanded a machine gun which was holding up the attack, killed the gun crew, and captured the gun. Later, while sniping the retreating enemy, this very gallant soldier was killed.

— The London Gazette, No. 30130, 12 June 1917

Brown's VC was only the second to be awarded to a soldier of the NZEF and the first as a result of an action on the Western Front. (Note: The first was to Corporal Cyril Bassett, for his actions during the Battle of Chunuk Bair on 8 August 1915.) Arthur Foljambe, the 2nd Earl of Liverpool and New Zealand's Governor General, presented the VC to Brown's father in a ceremony at Oamaru on 30 August 1917. The medal remains in the possession of his family but it has been loaned for display at Waitaki Boys' High School, the QEII Army Memorial Museum in Waiouru and the North Otago Museum.

Brown is buried at Warlencourt British Cemetery, France. A memorial tablet in his honour was unveiled in the Oamaru Municipal Chambers on 27 October 1917. In 1919, as part of an effort to recognise men from North Otago who had been killed in the war, an oak tree was planted in his memory in Oamaru. There is also a plaque honouring him in Queens Gardens, Dunedin.
