= John Wallace Pringle =

British engineer

Colonel Sir John Wallace Pringle, CB, FRGS (23 May 1863 – 16 July 1938) was a British engineer who was Chief Inspecting Officer of the Railways Inspectorate of the United Kingdom's Ministry of Transport from 1916 to 1929. As such, he was in charge of investigations into multiple railway accidents in the UK.

== Early life ==
Pringle was born in Madras, the son of a Scottish father, General George Pringle, and English mother, Octavia Catherine Cother.

== Early career ==
Pringle was commissioned a lieutenant in the Royal Engineers on 14 February 1883. As an army officer, Pringle fought in the Third Anglo-Burmese War from 1885 to1886. He was promoted to captain on 6 May 1891.

In the Uganda railway survey between 1891 and 1892, Pringle was second in command to James Macdonald. The survey's findings confirmed that the caravan route to the Great Rift Valley was the best path for the line, followed by the easiest gradient to be found over the Mau Escarpment and down to Lake Victoria. Macdonald and Pringle recommended constructing a three-foot six inch gauge railway. They suggested that Kikuyuland would be a suitable place for whites to live, and their civilizing effect would drive out slavery, but the railway was needed to give access to the new colony. Pringle became a Fellow of the Royal Geographical Society. He received the Gill Memorial from this society in 1895 for his work on the Uganda railway survey.
In 1896, he was appointed as the superintending engineer on the survey and construction of the Hyderabad-Godavari Valley Railway which comes under the Nizam's Guaranteed State Railway.

== Inspecting officer ==
Pringle was promoted to the rank of major on 25 January 1900, as he was appointed an inspecting officer of railways in the Board of Trade. He retired from the army in March 1903.

At the start of World War I in 1914, he was appointed a deputy director of railway transport with the temporary rank of colonel. In 1916, he was confirmed in this rank when he returned to the Board of Trade as Chief Inspecting Officer. When the Ministry of Transport was formed in 1919, he was transferred to the new ministry with his department, retaining his position as Chief Inspecting Officer until his retirement in 1929.

Pringle conducted various accident inquiries, including that into the Sevenoaks derailment of 24 August 1927. He chaired a committee to investigate the general adoption of automatic train control on British railways, following the adoption of an electro-mechanical system on the Great Western Railway (GWR), reporting in April 1922. He chaired a second committee on the same subject that reported in 1930, but little was done outside the GWR. He was chairman of the Electrification of Railways Advisory Committee, which reported in 1928.

Pringle was made a Companion of the Bath (CB) in 1921, and was knighted in 1925. He died at Cuckfield, Sussex on 16 July 1938 at the age of 75.
