= Warlencourt British Cemetery =

WWI CWGC cemetery in Pas-de-Calais, France

- Commonwealth War Graves Commission
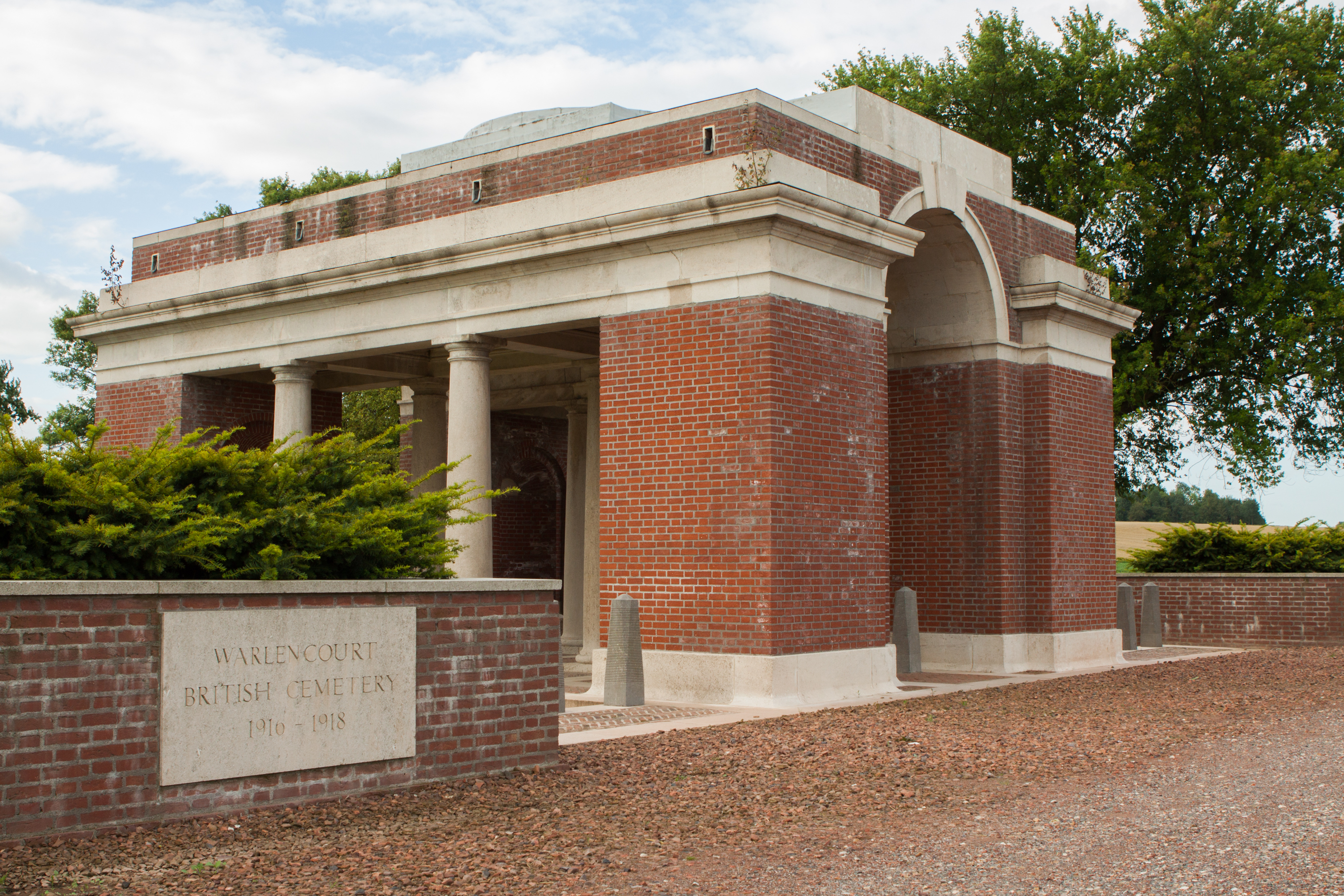
- Used for those deceased 1916–1918
- Established: 1919
- Location: 50°04′50″N 02°47′59″E near Bapaume, France
- Designed by: Sir Edward Lutyens
- Total burials: 3,505
- Unknowns: 1,823

Burials by nation
- Allied Powers: United Kingdom: 1,189; Australia: 339; South Africa: 108; New Zealand: 51; Canada: 2; Unknown: 1,823

Burials by war
- First World War: 3,505

Warlencourt British Cemetery is a burial ground for military personnel who died on the Western Front during the First World War. It is located in the Pas de Calais region of France. Established in 1919 to consolidate several smaller cemeteries, it was designed by Sir Edward Lutyens and is administered by the Commonwealth War Graves Commission (CWGC). There are 3,450 soldiers interred, of whom 1,823 are unidentified. There are also memorials to 55 soldiers whose graves are unknown. The majority of the soldiers who have been identified are British, with smaller numbers of Australians, South Africans, New Zealanders, and Canadians.

== History ==
The village of Warlencourt, in the commune of Warlencourt-Eaucourt, is southeast of Bapaume. The area saw extensive fighting at various stages from late 1916 to early 1918, during the Battle of the Somme, the Spring Offensive, and the Hundred Days Offensive.

== Foundation ==
The cemetery was established in late 1919 to receive the remains from other, smaller, cemeteries in the area as they were consolidated here. The consolidated cemeteries included the Hexham Road Cemetery, in Le Sars, which contained men who died during the period November 1916 to October 1917.

== Cemetery ==
Designed by the English architect Sir Edward Lutyens and administered by the Commonwealth War Graves Commission, the Warlencourt British Cemetery is located on the D929, a road running between Bapaume and Amiens.

The main entrance is along the northwest wall. At the far end of the cemetery, opposing the entrance, a Cross of Sacrifice is located. A Stone of Remembrance is positioned along the northeast wall, and on the wall itself is a memorial to 15 soldiers whose graves at Hexham Road Cemetery were destroyed by artillery fire. There is a further memorial to soldiers who graves are believed to be among those unidentified on the opposing southwest wall.

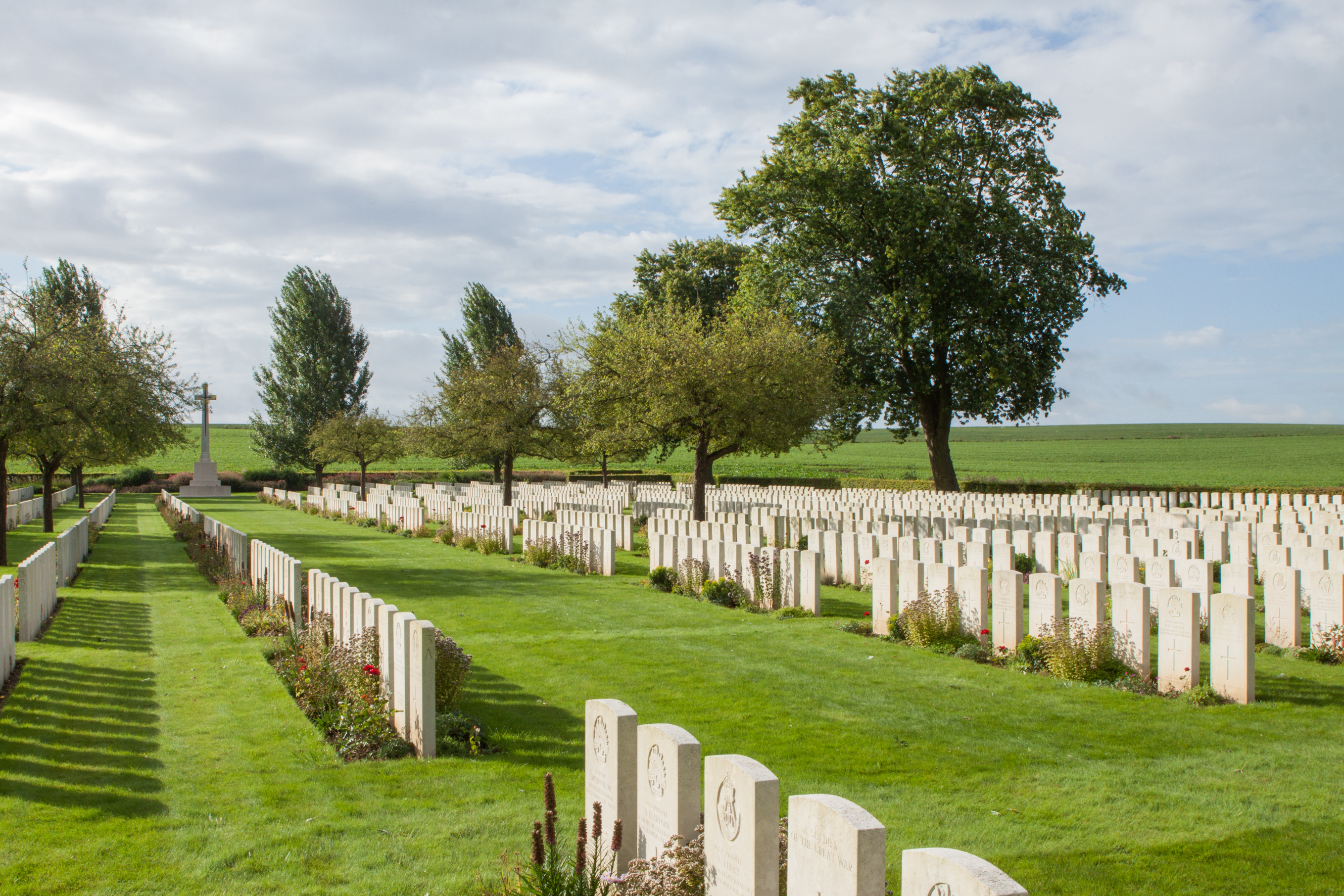
View to the southeast of the cemetery, towards the Cross of Sacrifice

The cemetery contains the remains of 3,450 soldiers who died during the First World War, with memorials to another 55 whose graves were lost. Of the interments, 1,823 are unidentified. The 1,683 known burials include 1,189 personnel from the United Kingdom, 339 soldiers of the Australian Imperial Force, and 108 members of the South African Overseas Expeditionary Force. There are also 51 soldiers of the New Zealand Expeditionary Force and two Canadians identified as being interred at the cemetery. A notable burial at Warlencourt is Sergeant Donald Forrester Brown, a Victoria Cross recipient who was killed in action on 1 October 1916.
