= John Terraine =

English military historian

John Alfred Terraine, FRHistS (15 January 1921 – 28 December 2003) was an English military historian and TV screenwriter. He is best known as the lead screenwriter for the landmark 1960s BBC-TV documentary The Great War, about the First World War, and for his defence of British General Douglas Haig – who commanded the British Expeditionary Force on the Western Front from late 1915 until the end of the war – against charges that he was "The Butcher of the Somme".

== Early life and education ==
Terraine was born in London and was educated at Stamford School and Keble College, Oxford.

== Radio and television ==
After leaving Oxford in 1943, he joined BBC radio and continued to work for the BBC for 18 years, ending as its Pacific and South African Programme Organiser. After resigning from the BBC in 1961, Terraine worked as a freelance television screenwriter. Among other series, Terraine was associate producer and chief screenwriter of the 1963–64 BBC-TV documentary The Great War, and co-wrote its sequel The Lost Peace (1965). For Rediffusion and Thames Television he wrote The Life and Times of Lord Mountbatten (1966–68) and Lord Mountbatten: A Man for the Century (1969), and later collaborated with Louis Mountbatten on an illustrated biography based on the series. Terraine found Mountbatten an impressive performer, but was intrigued by his "curious mix of boastfulness and diffidence". Terraine wrote and narrated The Mighty Continent (1974–75), a 13-part BBC-TV history of Europe in the first three-quarters of the 20th century.

== Writing ==
Terraine had 16 books published, most of them dealing with aspects of the great European wars of the 20th century, and numerous articles and book reviews for The Daily Telegraph. His first major study of the First World War, Mons: The Retreat to Victory, was published in 1960. In 1964 Terraine edited a collection of diaries written by General James Lochhead Jack during the First World War, which became a best-seller in the United Kingdom. The Right of the Line: The Royal Air Force in the European War 1939–45 (1985) won the Yorkshire Post Book of the Year award. His last book, Business in Great Waters: The U-Boat Wars, 1916–1945 was published in 1989.

== Later career ==
Terraine was the founding president of the Western Front Association from 1980 to 1997, after which he became its patron. One obituarist wrote that for sheer scholarship, the quality and accessibility of his writing and for his debunking of historical myths, Terraine was one of the outstanding military historians of the 20th century.

Terraine was for many years a member of the Royal United Services Institute for Defence Studies. He was awarded the institute's Chesney Gold Medal in 1982. He was elected a fellow of the Royal Historical Society in 1987.

== Personal life and death ==
In 1945 Terraine married Joyce Waite; they had one daughter.

Terraine died in London, aged 82.

== Works ==
- Mons: The Retreat to Victory (New York: Macmillan, 1960, ISBN 9781840222432)
- The Battle of Guise, August 1914 (History Today, 1960)
- The Army in Modern France (History Today, 1961)
- Douglas Haig: The Educated Soldier (1963)
- Ordeal of Victory (Philadelphia: J.B. Lippincott, 1963, ISBN 9780090681204)
- General Jack's Diary 1914–1918: The Trench Diary of Brigadier-General J.L. Jack, D.S.O. (London: Eyre & Spottiswoode, 1964)
- The Western Front 1914-1918 (London: Hutchinson, 1965)
- The Great War: A Pictorial History (New York: Macmillan, 1965)
- Monash: Australian Commander (History Today, 1966)
- The Life and Times of Lord Mountbatten (London: Hutchinson, 1968; new ed. 2013)
- Impacts of War, 1914 & 1918 (1971, ISBN 9780850523171)
- Democracy at War, Part I (History Today, 1971)
- Democracy at War, Part II (History Today, 1971)
- The Mighty Continent: A View of Europe in the Twentieth Century (1975)
- Trafalgar (New York: Mason, Charter: 1976)
- The Road to Passchendaele: The Flanders Offensive of 1917: A Study in Inevitability (London: Cooper, 1977)
- To Win A War: 1918, the Year of Victory (Garden City, New York: Doubleday, 1978)
- The Smoke and the Fire: Myths and Anti-Myths of War, 1861–1945 (London: Sidgwick and Jackson, 1980)
- White Heat: The New Warfare, 1914–18 (1982, ISBN 9780283988288)
- The First World War: 1914–1918 (1984)
- A Time for Courage: The Royal Air Force in the European War, 1939–1945 (1985, ISBN 9780026169707)
- The Right of the Line: The Role of the RAF in World War Two (1985)
- Business in Great Waters: The U-Boat Wars, 1916–1945 (1989, ISBN 9780850527605)
- John Terraine: Essays on Leadership and War 1914–18 (Western Front Association, 1998)
