= SR U class =

Class of 50 two-cylinder 2-6-0 locomotives

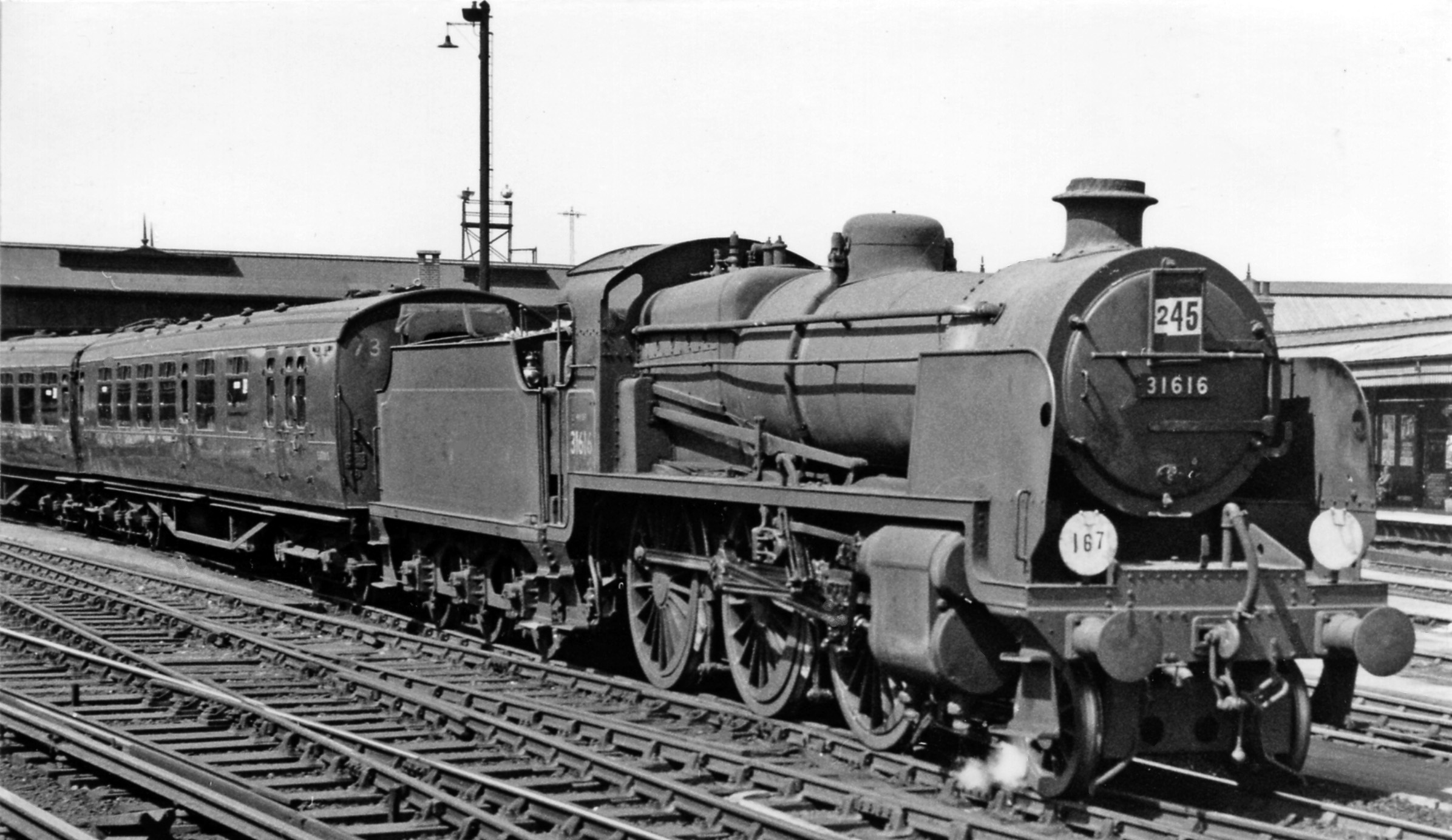
- 31616 leaving Clapham Carriage Yard with empty stock in 1959
Type and origin
- Power type: Steam
- Designer: Richard Maunsell
- Builder: Ashford Works, (20 new, 7 rebuilds); Brighton Works (10 new, 6 rebuilds); Eastleigh Works (7 rebuilds)
- Build date: 1928–1931
- Total produced: 50
Specifications
- Configuration
  - Whyte: 2-6-0
  - UIC: 1′C h2
- Gauge: 4 ft 8 1/2 in (1,435 mm) standard gauge
- Leading dia.: 3 ft 1 in (0.940 m)
- Driver dia.: 6 ft 0 in (1.829 m)
- Length: 57 ft 10 in (17.63 m)
- Total weight: 110 long tons 14 cwt (248,000 lb or 112.5 t); 110 long tons 14 cwt (112.5 t; 124.0 short tons)
- Fuel type: Coal
- Fuel capacity: 5 long tons 0 cwt (11,200 lb or 5.1 t); 5 long tons 0 cwt (5.1 t; 5.6 short tons)
- Water cap.: 4,000 imp gal (18,200 L; 4,800 US gal); 3,500 imp gal (15,900 L; 4,200 US gal) on earlier tenders
- Boiler pressure: 200 lbf/in^{2} (1.38 MPa)
- Cylinders: Two, outside
- Cylinder size: 19 in × 28 in (483 mm × 711 mm)
Performance figures
- Tractive effort: 23,866 lbf (106.16 kN)
Career
- Operators: Southern Railway →; British Railways
- Class: SECR / SR: U
- Power class: LSWR / SR: B; BR 1949–53: 4MT; BR 1953 on: 4P3F
- Numbers: SR : 1610-1639,1790-1809, BR : 31610-31639,31790-31809
- Nicknames: U Boats
- Locale: Southern Region
- Withdrawn: 1962–1966
- Disposition: Four preserved, remainder scrapped

The SR U class are 2-6-0 steam locomotives designed by Richard Maunsell for passenger duties on the Southern Railway (SR). The class represented the penultimate stage in the development of the Southern Railway's 2-6-0 "family", which improved upon the basic principles established by GWR Chief Mechanical Engineer (CME) George Jackson Churchward for Great Western Railway (GWR) locomotives. The U class design drew from experience with the GWR 4300s and N classes, improved by applying Midland Railway ideas to the design, enabling the SECR to influence development of the 2-6-0 in Britain.

The U class was designed in the mid-1920s for production at a time when more obsolete 4-4-0 locomotives were withdrawn, and derived from Maunsell's earlier SECR K (“River”) class 2-6-4 tank locomotives. The first 20 members of the U class were rebuilds of the K class locomotives, one of which was involved in the Sevenoaks railway accident. A further 20 U class locomotives were built in 1928 to fill the gap in cross-country and semi-fast express passenger services after the withdrawal of the K class. The design also continued the standardisation of the Southern Railway locomotive fleet by using parts designed to be interchangeable with other Maunsell-designed classes.

A total of 50 locomotives were built over three batches between 1928 and 1931, and the design formed the basis for the 3-cylinder U1 class of 1928. They were able to operate over most of the Southern Railway network, gaining the nickname "U-boats" after the submarine warfare of the First World War, and continued to operate with British Railways (BR). The class saw continuous use until 1966, when all members of the U class were withdrawn from service. Four U class locomotives have been preserved on two heritage railways in the south of England.

== Background ==
The history of the U class is complex as it is linked to the fate of the 2-cylinder K ("River") class 2-6-4 tank locomotives. The design work for a new passenger 2-6-0 with 6 ft (1.83 m) driving wheels was complete by 1927, when the involvement of a K class locomotive in the Sevenoaks rail crash presented an opportunity to bring forward construction of the class. The K class tank engines were the passenger counterpart to the N class 2-6-0 mixed-traffic design, and were noted for rough-riding over the cheaply laid track of the former SECR. The class was withdrawn from service, and the inquiry that followed determined that the rough-riding contributed to the crash. Its recommendation was that the K class should be rebuilt to 2-6-0 tender locomotives, using tried and tested features used by Maunsell and his assistant, the former GWR engineer Harold Holcroft on the N class.

The N class principles applied to the U class design aided mass production, and incorporated several features found on the GWR 4300 Class locomotives designed by Churchward. An order made in 1926 for a second batch of 20 K class locomotives was delayed until 1928, when the specification was revised to construct U class locomotives. It was intended to replace several elderly 4-4-0 classes within the former SECR's running fleet, and attempted to standardise and ease maintenance of locomotives by sharing parts with other Maunsell designs. The style of the new locomotive reflected the Midland Railway influence of another of Maunsell's assistants, the ex-Midland Railway engineer James Clayton. The addition of a tender increased the operating range of the U class over its K class predecessors, and the wheel arrangement applied to the former K class locomotives improved the locomotive's stability when operational.

== Construction details ==
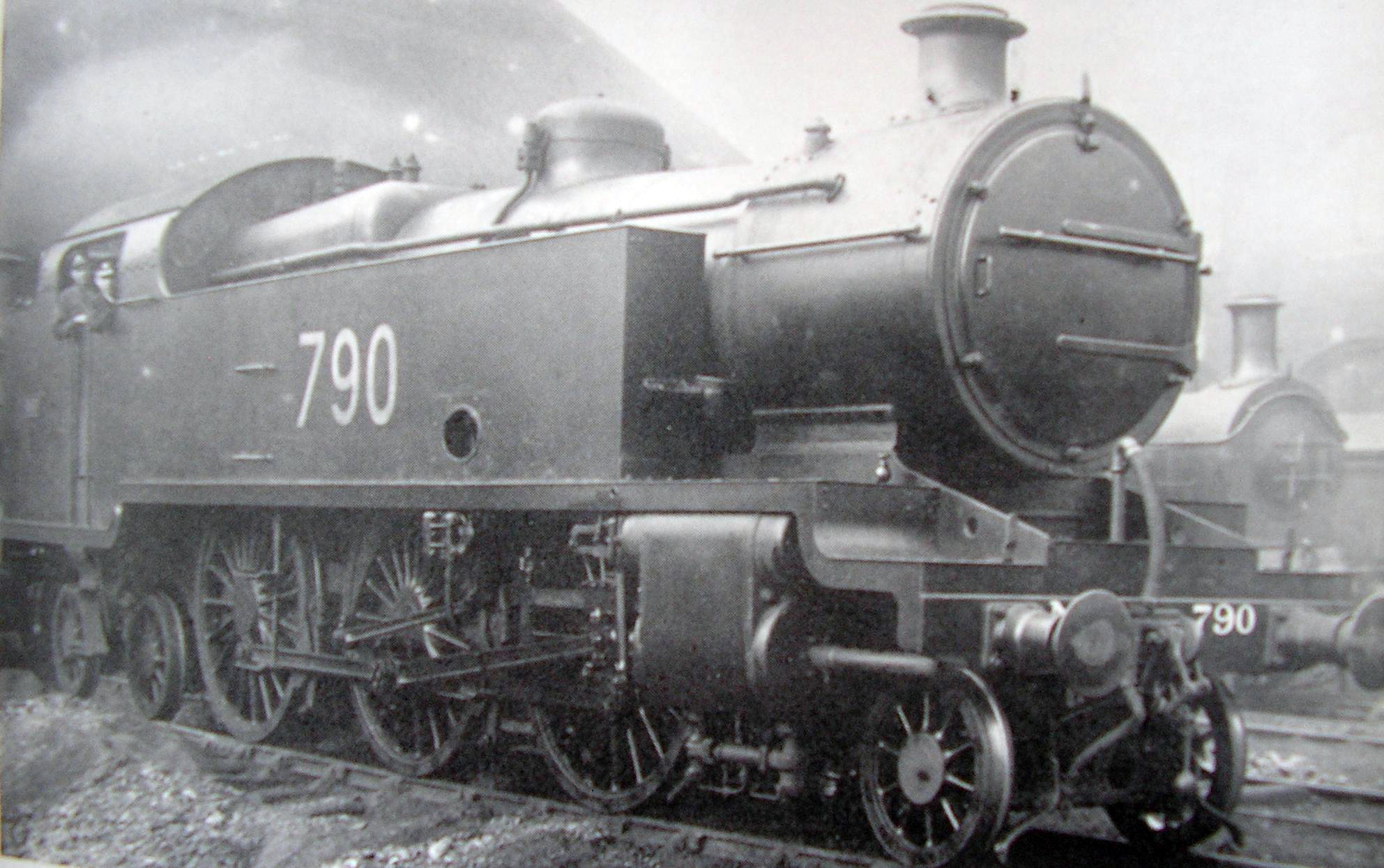
The prototype K class No. 790 under SECR ownership. All twenty members of the class were rebuilt in 1928 to the U class design following an accident the previous year

=== K class rebuilds ===
The rebuilding programme that followed the derailment of K class No. A800 "River Cray" at Sevenoaks began at Ashford works in June 1928. The work involved in converting a 2-6-4 tank engine to a 2-6-0 tender locomotive included the removal of the side water tanks, rear coal bunker and trailing axles, although the 6 ft (1.83 m) driving wheels, right-hand drive and N class–type boiler were retained. The aesthetic aspects inherited from the K class were the former Midland Railway engineer James Clayton’s contributions to the design, creating a simple, functional locomotive similar to the N class.

The rebuilt locomotives were given a tender and a re-designed cab that bore a strong resemblance to those featured on designs by Henry Fowler. Two designs of Maunsell tender were used, the straight-sided 3,500 imperial gallons (15,911 L) variety, and the larger 4,000-imperial-gallon (18,184 L) design used on later batches of the N class with inward-sloping raves to prevent coal spillage. The first rebuild was No. A805 River Camel, which also became the first U class locomotive into service in March 1928, three months before the first production locomotive under construction at Brighton. The rapid turnaround was achieved as design work was already in place, and the rebuilding of existing locomotives was cheaper than building from scratch.

No. A805 was put on performance trials prior to work commencing on rebuilding of the rest of the class at Brighton and Eastleigh works. The rebuilds lost their names because of the bad publicity attached to the "River" class after the 1927 crash, and the heavily damaged No. A800 was the last member of the K class to be rebuilt to U class configuration in December 1928. The unique 3-cylinder "River" tank, K1 class No. A890 River Frome was also rebuilt to the general U class specification, becoming the prototype of Maunsell's 3-cylinder U1 class derivative in June 1928.

=== First production batch and differences with rebuilt locomotives ===
Construction of the delayed 1926 order for 20 K class locomotives began in 1928 after alteration to the U class specification. As a result of Harold Holcroft's position as one of Maunsell's assistants, the new-builds also displayed the Churchward GWR 4300 Class influence. The ideas applied to this class were already used on the N, N1 and K class rebuilds, including long-travel valves for fast running, Belpaire firebox and conical boilers, constructed at the North British Locomotive Works in Glasgow. The first of the production batch emerged from Brighton works in August 1928 and featured a tapered chimney and smokebox snifting valves, both of which were used on the K and N class locomotives.

The 20 locomotives of the first production batch were split equally between Brighton and Ashford works, and all were completed by December 1929. The production locomotives had a slightly different profile to the K class rebuilds and featured left-hand drive to improve the visibility of signals from the driver's side of the footplate. They also had higher running plates along the sides of the boiler than the rebuilds, which required smaller wheel splashers to cover the tops of the driving wheels. Another variation was the flatter top to the dome covers, as the rebuilds retained the high N class type used on the K class.

In common with the N, N1 and K class locomotives, the Midland Railway influence of Clayton showed in the placement of locomotive fittings on the production batch, as the water top-feed into the boiler was located inside a dome, whilst the cab area was a modified version of those on the 0-6-0s of Henry Fowler and the K class rebuilds. The rebuilds had Midland Railway-style double spectacle plates (the small windows on the front face of the cab) left over from the K class cabs, whereas the production versions had one each side of the boiler. Such modifications were becoming typical of the Southern Railway's attempt to produce a fleet of standardised locomotives. However, all members of the U class were to vary from GWR practice, as the superheating surface area was increased, and all were equipped with outside Walschaerts valve gear.

=== Second production batch and modifications ===
The second batch of ten new-build U class locomotives was constructed between February and May 1931 when more obsolete locomotives were withdrawn from service. This brought the total of new-build locomotives to 30, and the total number of operational U class engines to 50. The new batch also featured detail differences from the rest of the class, such as the arrangement of the footsteps at the front of the locomotive, though continued to use the standard left-hand drive cab layout to improve the driver's forward vision from the cab. Smoke deflectors were fitted to the whole class from 1933 to prevent drifting smoke from obscuring forward vision. The smokebox snifting valves applied to the class by Maunsell were removed by his successor Oliver Bulleid, who also fitted U1 class chimneys to improve the draughting.

== Operational details ==
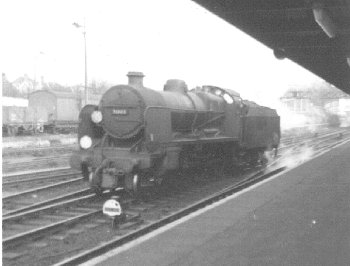
K class rebuild number 31803 at Bournemouth during the British Railways era. Note the double spectacle plates on the left-hand cab front next to the boiler

The U class was a reliable and economical design more than capable of attaining speeds in excess of 70 mph (110 km/h) as a result of being fitted with long-travel valves. They had high capacity, tapered boilers which promoted free steaming, and 6 ft (1.83 m) driving wheels which allowed fast running over long distances. They were distributed more widely than their N class counterparts, although one drawback in operating the class was the size of the cylinders and cab, which meant the U class was out of gauge for the Tonbridge-Hastings line due to inadequate clearances in tunnels along the route. Otherwise, their "go anywhere" nature earned them the nickname of "U-boats", and crews praised their abilities to achieve what they were designed to do.

The Southern Railway operating department undertook trials to improve fleet efficiency. When built, Eastbourne-based No. A629 was fitted with an experimental pulverised fuel burner of German design; the experiment was terminated when a minor explosion was caused by the powdered coal coming into contact with sparks thrown from the blastpipe. The experiment also proved that pulverised coal was a false economy, as much of the fine dust was sucked through the chimney without combustion taking place. The locomotive was returned to normal coal burning in 1935. In 1947 the class became a test-bed for a government-backed scheme regarding fuelling arrangements in anticipation of a coal shortage. Two of the class, Nos. 1625 and 1797, were converted to oil burning, with more set to follow suit; but the project was abandoned and the two oil burners were reverted to coal-firing before this could take place.

All members of the class entered British Railways service in 1948, and from 1955 23 of the U class received chimneys of the British Railways Standard Class 4 variety and replacement cylinders, which had become worn through intensive use. A few members of the class were given replacement frames at overhaul with a shallower curve between the front buffer beam and smokebox. During the early 1960s, the withdrawal of the ageing T9 class designed by Dugald Drummond saw the U class replacing them on services west of Exeter, though their large wheels offered little advantage on the steeper gradients that characterised this part of the railway network. The favoured form of 2-6-0 motive power west of Exeter was the smaller-wheeled N class, while heavier passenger work was allocated to Bulleid's Unrebuilt Light Pacifics, which were within the weight restrictions imposed in this area. The U class represented one of the less glamorous classes of passenger locomotive due to the fact that they were used mainly on mixed-traffic and secondary passenger duties.

== Withdrawal ==
The class were withdrawn between 1962 and 1966.

Table of withdrawals
Year	Quantity in service at start of year	Quantity withdrawn	Locomotive numbers
1962	50	2	31610/30.
1963	48	14	31611–12/14–15/23/31/33–37, 31794–95, 31805.
1964	34	24	31613/16–18/21–22/24–26/28–29/32/38, 31792–93/96–98, 31801–02/04/06–08.
1965	10	6	31619–20/27, 31790/99, 31800.
1966	4	4	31639, 31791, 31803/09.

== Accidents and incidents ==
- On 25 May 1933, a passenger train, hauled by LSWR M7 Class 0-4-4T No. 107, was derailed at Raynes Park, London, coming to rest foul of an adjacent line. A U class locomotive, hauling a passenger train, was in a side-long collision with it. Five people were killed and 35 were injured. The cause of the accident was the failure to implement a speed restriction on a section of track that was under maintenance. The U class engine is given as No. 1621 in the official accident report but as No. 1618 in another source.
- On 14 November 1949, a rake of carriages was left foul of an adjacent line at Bournemouth Central station, Hampshire. Locomotive No. 31624 collided with them and was derailed. One person was injured.
- On 18 November 1962, locomotive No. 31816 was derailed at Tipton Yard, Eastleigh, Hampshire.
- On 26 July 2010, the tender of locomotive No. 31806 was damaged in a fire at Ropley sheds on the Watercress Line. The tender wasn't severely damaged and was reunited with 31806 soon after being repaired.

== Preservation ==
Four members of the class have been preserved, two built at Ashford Works and two built at Brighton Works. All four surviving U Classes have steamed at some point in preservation and out of these four locomotives, 31625 and 31806 have worked on the mainline. 31806 went out for its loaded test run on Fri 13 Apr 2018 running from Wareham to Yeovil Junction via Weymouth and hauled its inaugural railtour "The Great Britain XI" from Yeovil Junction to Swanage on Thur 26 Apr 2018. No 1638 steamed for the first time in preservation in February 2006 on the Bluebell Railway.

Note: Loco numbers in bold mean their current number.

Number		Builder	Built	Withdrawn	Service Life	Tender Fitted	Location	Livery	Owner	Status	Image
1618	**31618**	Brighton Works	Oct 1928	Jan 1964	35 Years, 3 months	3,500 Gal	Bluebell Railway	BR Black, Late Crest	Maunsell Locomotive Society.	Static display (at Sheffield Park shed) awaiting overhaul. Last operational in 1994 and was the second locomotive to leave Barry Scrapyard in January 1969.	
1625	**31625**	Ashford Works	Mar 1929	Jan 1964	34 Years, 10 months	4,000 Gal	Swanage Railway	BR Black, Late Crest	John Bunch.	Stored near Corfe Castle station.	
**1638**	31638	Ashford Works	May 1931	Jan 1964	32 Years, 8 months	4,000 Gal	Bluebell Railway	SR Olive Green	Owned by the Bluebell Railway, on long-term loan to the Maunsell Society.	Static display (at Horsted Keynes) awaiting overhaul. Last operational 4 July 2015.	
1806	**31806**	Brighton Works	Jun 1928	Jan 1964	35 Years, 7 months	3,500 Gal	Swanage Railway	BR Lined Black, Late Crest	John Bunch.	Operational, mainline certified. Returned to service in 2021, the only survivor of the K class rebuilds.	

== Livery and numbering ==
=== Southern Railway ===
From 1928, the entire class was painted in Maunsell's lined Southern Railway Olive green with yellow markings and "Southern" on the tender. During the Second World War, the U class was painted in wartime black livery with Oliver Bulleid's Sunshine yellow lettering, and some were later painted in lined Malachite green livery. The class was initially numbered in the Southern Railway's post-grouping system from A790–A809 for the K class rebuilds, and A610–A639 with the production batches. The "A" in the numbering system denotes Ashford, where the locomotive design had originated. Southern numbering policy was eventually rationalised, the other U class locomotives were subsequently renumbered to 1790–1809, and 1610–1639 at the same time.

=== British Railways ===
The entire class was absorbed by British Railways in 1948, and in January 1949 was given the power classification 4MT, denoting a mixed traffic locomotive. In October 1953 this was revised to 4P3F. Livery was initially similar to the Southern Railway, though with "British Railways" on the tender, and an "S" prefix to the Southern number. This was succeeded by the British Railways mixed-traffic lined black livery with red, cream and grey lining and the British Railways crest on the tender. The British Railways standard numbering system was used to replace the Southern Railway system, and the class was allocated the series 31790–31809 for the K class rebuilds, and 31610–31639 for the rest.
