= Sevenoaks railway accident =

1927 railway incident in Kent, England

Coordinates: 51.28404°N 0.17264°E

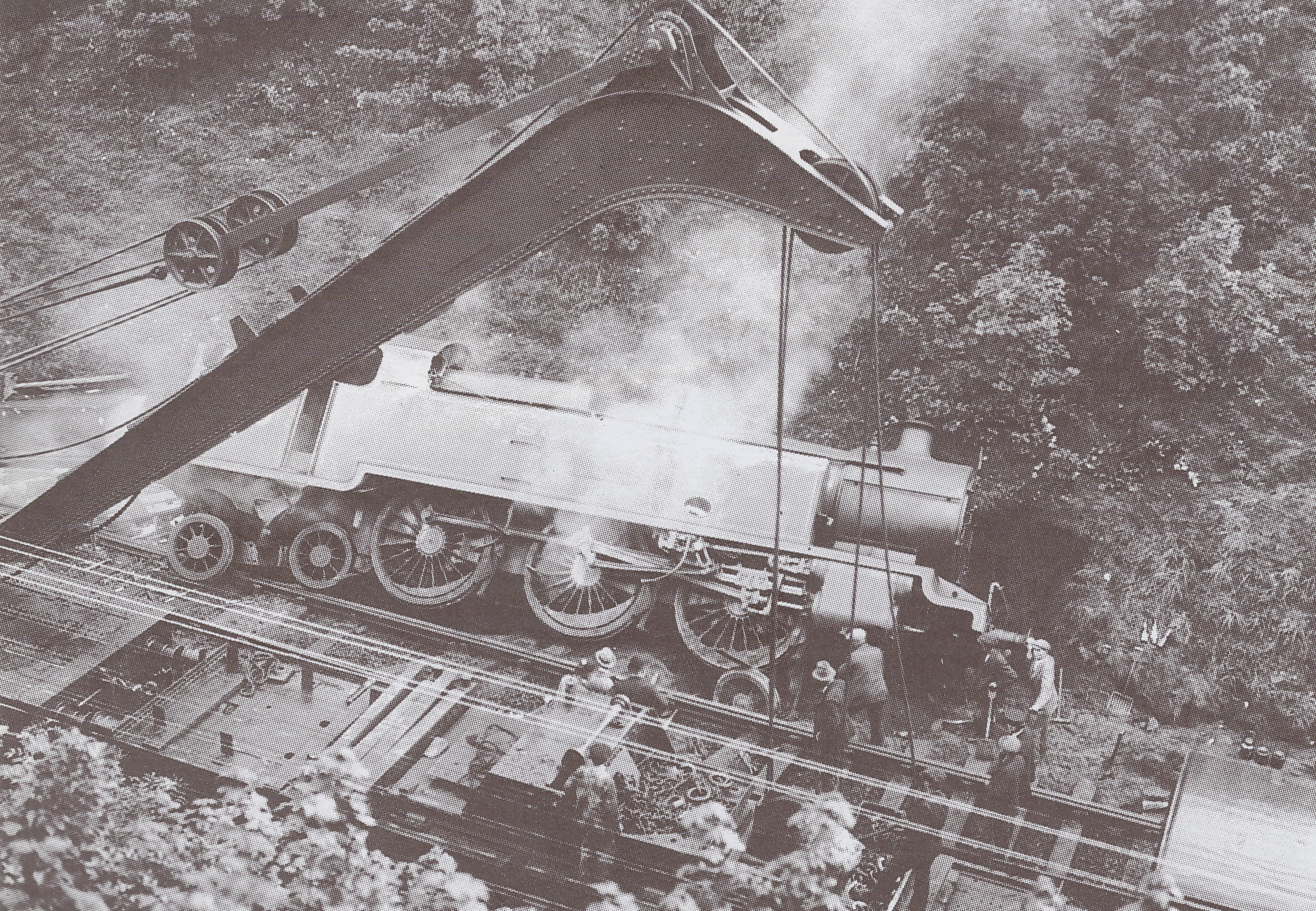
- The derailed locomotive on its side.

Details
- Date: 24 August 1927; 17:30
- Location: near Sevenoaks railway station
- Country: England
- Line: South Eastern Main Line
- Cause: Derailment of locomotive

Statistics
- Trains: 1
- Deaths: 13
- Injured: 21

The Sevenoaks railway accident occurred on 24 August 1927 between Dunton Green railway station and Sevenoaks railway station. The Southern Railway's afternoon express from Cannon Street to Deal left London at 5 pm, hauled by River Class tank engine No 800 River Cray. Several passengers later recounted that from time to time the train seemed to roll excessively on fast curves. As it passed through Pollhill Tunnel at 60 mph (97 km/h) the rocking became violent and the train derailed past Dunton Green railway station, where the line is in a cutting which is spanned by a bridge carrying Shoreham Lane. The cab of the locomotive struck the bridge and the engine was turned on its side across the cutting. The leading coaches piled up against it, killing 13 and injuring many more. Railway engineer Brigadier-General Archibald Jack was a survivor of the crash.

John Wallace Pringle, Chief Inspecting Officer of His Majesty's Railway Inspectorate conducted the inquiry in person. Following the accident, the Southern Railway withdrew all the remaining 'River' class tank engines, which caused a public sensation at the time. Other drivers testified about the instability of the class and it emerged that one locomotive had previously derailed at speed, though it had re-railed itself. The engines' high centre of gravity, their hard springing, and the tendency for the water in the side tanks to surge, all caused the engines to roll dangerously at speed, so much so that in this accident the nearside wheels had lifted.

Trials carried out after the accident showed that the design behaved well when running at 85 mph (137 km/h) on the Great Northern main line out of King's Cross, indicating that an indifferent permanent way was partly responsible for the instability of the locomotives. However, before the results of the trials had been published, all River class engines had been rebuilt, becoming the first 20 of the SR U class 2-6-0 tender engine design.

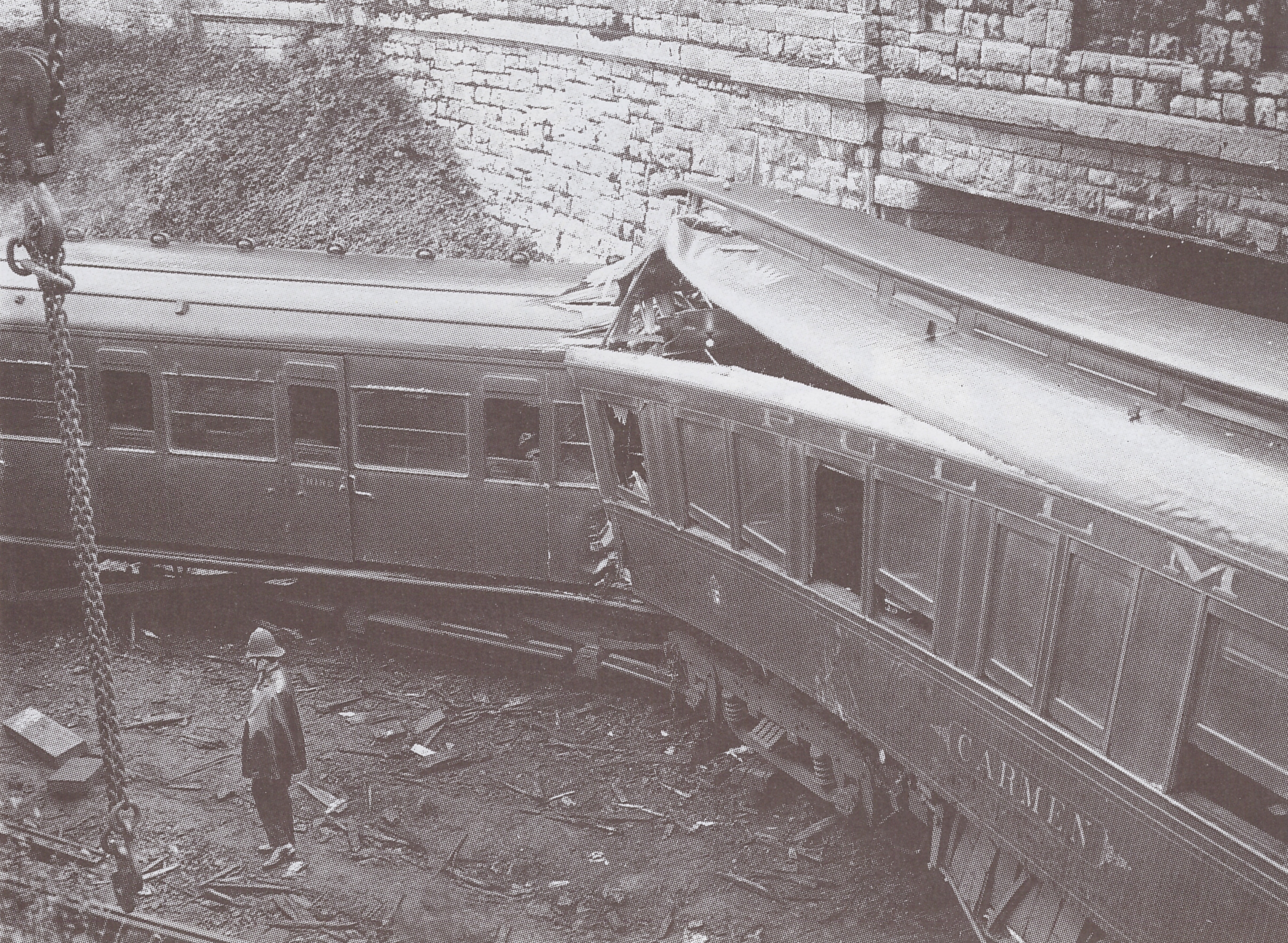
Wrecked coaches against the bridge.

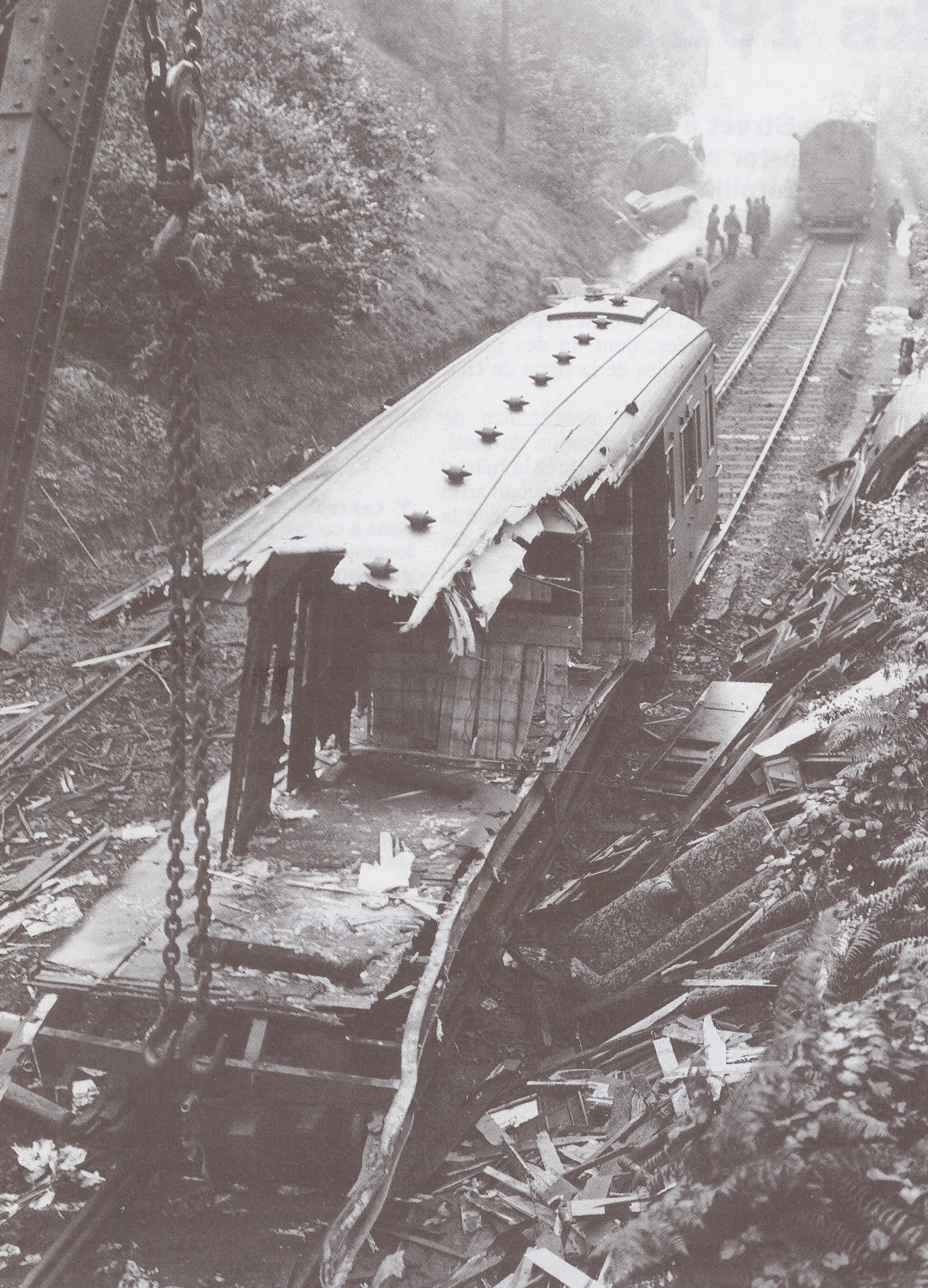
Wrecked coach.

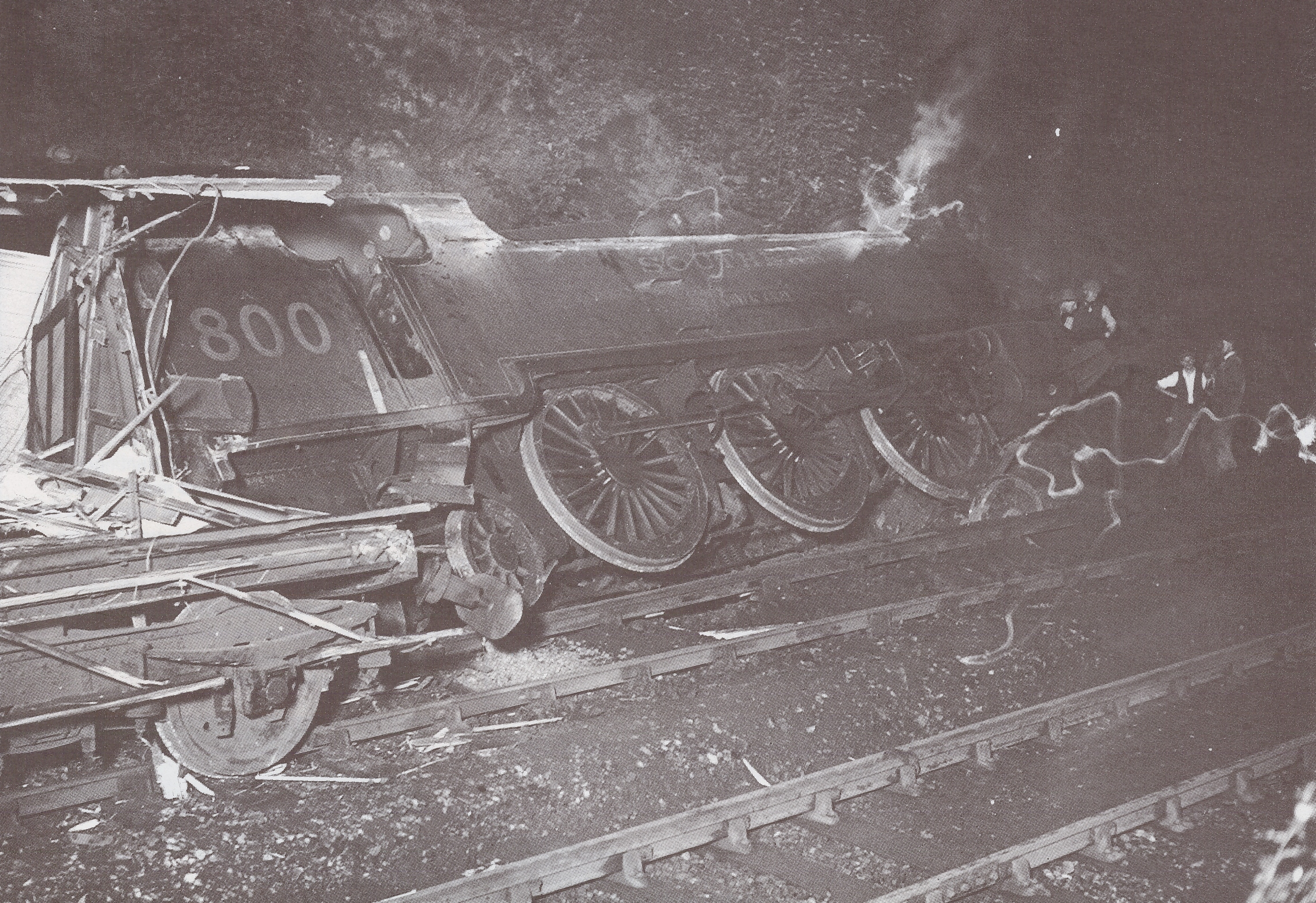
The overturned locomotive.

== Sources ==
- Rolt, L.T.C.; Kichenside, Geoffrey (1982) [1955]. Red for Danger (4th ed.). Newton Abbot: David & Charles. pp. 89–91. ISBN 0-7153-8362-0.
