= Western Front Association =

Historical society focused on studying the Western Front of World War 1

The Western Front Association
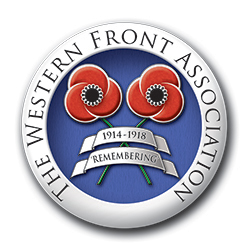
- Formation: 1980
- Legal status: Registered Charity
- Website: www.westernfrontassociation.com

The Western Front Association (WFA) was inaugurated on 11 November 1980, in order to further interest in the Great War of 1914–1918. The WFA aims to perpetuate the memory, courage and comradeship of all those who fought on all sides and who served their countries during the Great War. The Western Front Association does not seek to justify or glorify war. It is not a reenactment society, nor is it commercially motivated. It is entirely non-political. The object of the Association is to educate the public in the history of The Great War with particular reference to the Western Front.

The WFA was established by military historian John Giles, who enlisted the help of the historian John Terraine, who co-wrote the landmark television series The Great War, which was first broadcast by the BBC in 1964. Giles was driven to form The Western Front Association as a result of the creation of such groups as 'The Gallipoli Association' which had been established in 1969, and, in the early 1970s the 'Waterloo Association' which had been set up to save the old battlefield. It was in this context, over the following years, that John Giles developed the idea for an association on the First World War with its emphasis on the Western Front. It would be, John Giles was clear, 'The Western Front' and not, in his words about 'Salonica or Naval battles; - the definitive article 'The' was also stipulated. And thus in November 1980 The Western Front Association was established.

Since its foundation the WFA has grown over the years to in excess of 6,000 members worldwide. There are around 60 branches in the UK, Europe, USA, Canada, Australia and New Zealand. The WFA also now recognises all theatres of war and fronts covering every aspect of British and global history at this time.

The Western Front Association is a UK registered charity, numbered 298365.

== Website ==
The website of The Western Front Association is a hub for this educational charity: content and resources included many hundreds of articles, book reviews and podcasts, as well as member login access to 8.4 million digitised Pension Records, archived journals and magazines, including the entire 40+ year archive of the WFA's own journal 'Stand To!' and member magazine 'Bulletin'. Further resources include a vast collection of thousands of stereoview photographs, a collection of 12 virtual battlefield tours and the WFA's TrenchMapper App which allows the user to identify locations along the Western Front using maps of the period and overlay these with a modern map.

== Branches ==
With nearly sixty branches worldwide, including fifty in the UK and Ireland, the WFA has a representation in most counties in the UK and in most of 'main combatant' countries which took part in the Great War.

Membership of the WFA is not a requisite to attend branch meetings, which are open to the public. There are no formal charges for attending these meetings, but a donation on the door is usually requested, this is typically between £3 and £5. Most branches hold an event at least once a month, so there are between 500 and 600 meetings up and down the UK every year in which an aspect of the Great War is discussed.

== Publications ==
The WFA publishes its journal, 'Stand To!' four times a year. This contains articles on the military and social history of The Great War on all fronts globally: at sea, in the air, on land and at home. There is also a house magazine for members, the 'Bulletin', which is also published three times each year. An electronic newsletter 'Trench Lines' is also available produced. In addition there are over 250 podcasts 'Mentioned in Dispatches' and on the WFA YouTube channel many hundreds of videos - often carefully produced recordings of webinars and in-person lectures.

== Videos ==
The Western Front Association has for many years made videos of lectures held at its events, as well as making a short film of the Armistice Day event at the Cenotaph, Whitehall every 11 November. There are now several hundred videos available. During the COVID-19 Pandemic a series of regular online talks were initiated, sometimes meeting twice a week during this period - as a result there is now a large, readily accessed collection of video talks on The Western Front Association's YouTube channel. As these online talks were so successful they have continued to feature regularly, usually on a Monday evening two or more times a month.

== Annual Service of Remembrance ==
The WFA organises each year the Remembrance ceremony held at the Cenotaph in Whitehall, London on 11 November (except when the 11th falls on Remembrance Sunday). The 2014 ceremony was attended by then Prime Minister, David Cameron.

== First World War records saved ==
Members of the WFA have access to a subset of Fold3. It provides access to the War Office medal index cards and the Ministry of Pensions index cards and ledgers, both of which were saved by the WFA.

=== Medal Index Cards ===
The Medal Index Cards were saved from destruction in 2005. Medal Index Cards (MICs) are the original method of recording medal entitlement for soldiers who served in the Great War. Each soldier who served in an active theatre of operations was awarded a medal.

The Medal Index Cards were stored at the Ministry of Defence record centre in Hayes, up until its closure in 2005. Due to the need to make space, the MoD sold the Hayes site for redevelopment; the MoD (which owned the cards) proposed the cards would be destroyed. No museum or archive was prepared to take them on, so the Western Front Association came forward and agreed to save these records.

Since obtaining these cards, the WFA has been storing them. Many WFA members requested copies, often placing the card in a frame alongside the medals. An admin fee of £5 was payable, for a colour copy.

The cards were scanned as colour images, and made available via Ancestry.com in February 2008.

=== Pension Index Cards and Ledgers ===
In November 2012, the WFA announced that it has secured over six million Pension Index Cards and Ledgers from the UK's Ministry of Defence, which would otherwise have been destroyed. These are an extremely valuable primary source for family and military historians as they provide information on men (and some women) who served in the Great War and who subsequently applied for a pension. This significantly adds to the data that is available, particularly for those individuals who survived the Great War.

Prior to the digitisation, it was possible to pay an admin fee of £25 for the records to be consulted, and copied where relevant to the search.

The digitisation of these records was announced in December 2017, the initial batch being released October 2018, the task being completed in 2021.

== Sound archives at the Imperial War Museum ==
The Imperial War Museum's sound archive holds over 33,000 recordings relating to conflict since 1914. This consists of the largest oral history collection of its type in the world, with contributions from both service personnel and non-combatants as well as significant holdings of speeches, sound effects, broadcasts, poetry and music. The Western Front Association funded digitisation of the majority of IWM's First World War sound recordings, thereby widening public access to this important historical resource.

== Tours ==
The Western Front Association organises tours of the battlefields for its members three times a year. Many of the WFA's branches organise similar tours at a local level.

== Honorary office holders ==
Patrons: Prof. Hew Strachan FRSE, FRHistS
Professor Peter Simkins MBE FRHistS

Honorary President: Professor Gary Sheffield BA MA PhD FRHistS

Honorary Vice Presidents:

Professor John Bourne BA PhD FRHistS
The Burgomaster of Ypres
The Mayor of Albert
Col (Rtd) Patrick M Dennis OMM
Lt. Col. (Rtd) Christopher Pugsley DPhil FRHistS
Dr Roger V. Lee PhD jssc
Major-General (ret'd) Mungo Melvin CB OBE
Dr Jack Sheldon MA PhD FRGS
Dr Spencer Jones

Past Patrons:

Sir John Glubb KCB, CMG, DSO, OBE, MC
John Terraine FRHist.
Colonel Terry Cave, CBE.

Past Presidents:

John Terraine FRHist.S
Correlli Barnett CBE, DSc, MA, FRSI, FRHistS, FRSA

Past Vice Presidents:
The Earl Kitchener TD, DL
Tony Noyes CEng MICE
John Toland
The Prince Albrecht, Duke of Bavaria
General Sir Anthony Farrar-Hockley, GBE, KCB, DSO, MC
The Earl Haig, OBE, KStJ, DL
Col Terry Cave CBE
Leonard G. Shurtleff
André Coillot.
