= James Lochhead Jack =

British Army general

Brigadier-General James Lochhead Jack DSO* JP DL
- Born: 1880
- Died: 22 December 1962 (aged 81–82) Leicestershire, England

Brigadier-General James Lochhead Jack (1880 – 22 December 1962) was a British Army officer who fought during the First World War. In 1964, his diaries were published (edited by John Terraine) and became a bestseller.

== Military career ==
Jack was commissioned as a second lieutenant in the 4th (Militia) Battalion of the Argyll and Sutherland Highlanders on 14 January 1903. The militia battalions were reserve regiments, and the 3rd battalion was headquartered in Stirling.

In September he transferred to the Regular Army and the Cameronians (Scottish Rifles). By now aged twenty-three, "his Regular military career had made something of a late start", although he had served in the Second Boer War with the Scottish Horse and the 1st Battalion of the Argylls. In November 1908 he was appointed as an adjutant of the 1st Battalion of his regiment, holding this position until 1911 when he became a company commander.

He was deployed to France with his battalion in August 1914, shortly after the outbreak of the First World War, as part of the British Expeditionary Force (BEF) although the battalion was initially unassigned to any parent brigade. Instead, it served as lines of communication troops before joining the newly formed 19th Infantry Brigade, "an independent formation attached to no division". Jack was to serve with the brigade headquarters as its staff captain from 28 August until 2 November before returning to his battalion.

In August 1916 he was appointed commanding officer (CO) of the 2nd Battalion, West Yorkshire Regiment, which formed part of the 23rd Infantry Brigade of the 8th Division.

On 8 September 1918 he was placed in command of the 28th Infantry Brigade and was granted the temporary rank of brigadier general while employed in this role.

== Personal life ==
He was married to Jeanette Watson (1902–1996) and was survived by her and two sons, Kenneth and Angus.
