= Warlencourt-Eaucourt =

- Commune
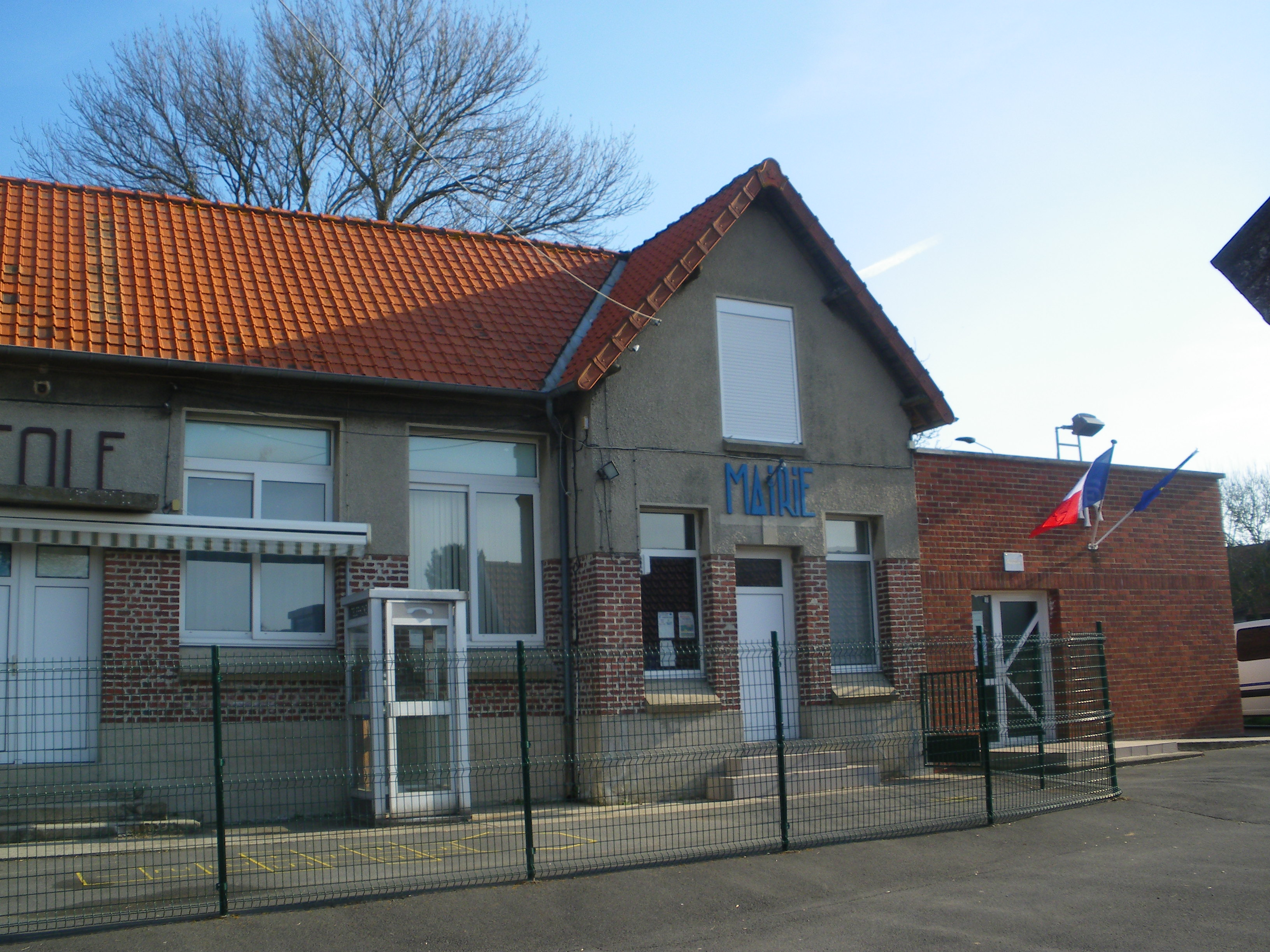
- The town hall of Warlencourt-Eaucourt

- Coat of arms
- Location of Warlencourt-Eaucourt
- Location within France Location within Hauts-de-France
- Coordinates: 50°05′00″N 2°47′27″E
- Country: France
- Region: Hauts-de-France
- Department: Pas-de-Calais
- Arrondissement: Arras
- Canton: Bapaume
- Intercommunality: Sud-Artois

Government
  - Mayor (2020–2026): Serge Deroubay
- Area^{1}: 3.71 km^{2} (1.43 sq mi)
- Elevation: 106 m (348 ft)
- Highest elevation: 128 m (420 ft)
- Lowest elevation: 92 m (302 ft)
- Population (2023): 131
  - Density: 35.3/km^{2} (91.5/sq mi)
- Time zone: UTC+01:00 (CET)
  - Summer (DST): UTC+02:00 (CEST)
- INSEE/Postal code: 62876 /62450
- ^{1} French Land Register data, which excludes lakes, ponds, glaciers > 1 km^{2} (0.386 sq mi or 247 acres) and river estuaries.

Warlencourt-Eaucourt (French pronunciation: [waʁlɑ̃kuʁ okuʁ]; Picard: Warlencourt-Iaucourt) is a commune in the Pas-de-Calais department in the Hauts-de-France region of France.

== Geography ==
Warlencourt-Eaucourt is situated some 16 miles (26 km) south of Arras, at the junction of the D929 and the D10E roads.

== Population ==
Historical population
Year	Pop.	±% p.a.
1968	102	—
1975	85	−2.57%
1982	84	−0.17%
1990	81	−0.45%
1999	107	+3.14%
2007	146	+3.96%
2012	167	+2.72%
2017	138	−3.74%
2023	131	−0.86%
Source: INSEE

== Places of interest ==
- The church of St. Pierre, rebuilt, along with the rest of the village, after World War I.
- The Warlencourt British Cemetery, in which over 3,000 soldiers who died during World War I are buried.
- The war memorials:
  - A pyramid with a Catholic cross on the Rue du Calvaire. Erected on 30 August 1925 to commemorate WWI dead (4 percent of the pre-war population), also commemorates WWII dead.
  - Butte de Warlencourt memorial, commemorating the 1916 battle on the ancient burial mound

== See also ==
- Communes of the Pas-de-Calais department
