= Archibald Jack =

New Zealand railway engineer and British army officer

Brigadier-General Archibald Jack CB CMG CBE
- Born: 1874; Hokitika, New Zealand
- Died: 29 January 1939 (aged 64–65)
- Military career
- Allegiance: United Kingdom
- Branch: New Zealand Military Forces; British Army
- Rank: Brigadier-General
- Conflicts: Second Boer War; First World War; Russian Civil War
- Awards: Companion of the Order of the Bath; Companion of the Order of St Michael and St George; Commander of the Order of the British Empire; Mentioned in dispatches (3); Order of the Rising Sun, 3rd Class (Japan)

Brigadier-General Archibald Jack, CB, CMG, CBE (1874 – 29 January 1939) was a New Zealand-born railway engineer and British Army officer.

== Early life and career ==
Jack was educated at Otago Boys' High School and began his career in the New Zealand Department of Public Works in 1893. He was commissioned into the 9th Battalion, New Zealand Regiment on the outbreak of the Second Boer War and served in South Africa. The war over, he returned to civilian life, working for the Central South African Railways from 1902 to 1908, the Tientsin-Pakow Railway in China from 1909 to 1910, and on the railways of Argentina from 1911 to 1916.

== First World War ==
In 1916 he sailed to Britain, was commissioned into the Royal Engineers in 1917 as a temporary lieutenant-colonel and served in Romania. In 1918 he was promoted colonel and was given command of the British Railway Mission on the Trans-Siberian Railway in Russia, responsible for co-ordinating the operation of the railway during the Russian Civil War. He was promoted to the temporary rank of brigadier-general in 1919. He was mentioned in dispatches three times and was appointed Commander of the Order of the British Empire (CBE) and Companion of the Order of St Michael and St George (CMG) in 1919, and Companion of the Order of the Bath (CB) in the Siberian War Honours of January 1920.

== Later career and life ==
Following the war, Jack returned to civilian life as general manager of the United Railways of Havana, Cuba from 1920 until his retirement in 1925. On one occasion, he was shot through the head by a striker, but miraculously survived. He also survived being torpedoed three times during the war and was a survivor of the Sevenoaks railway disaster of 1927.
